= CapitaSpring =

Office skyscraper in Singapore

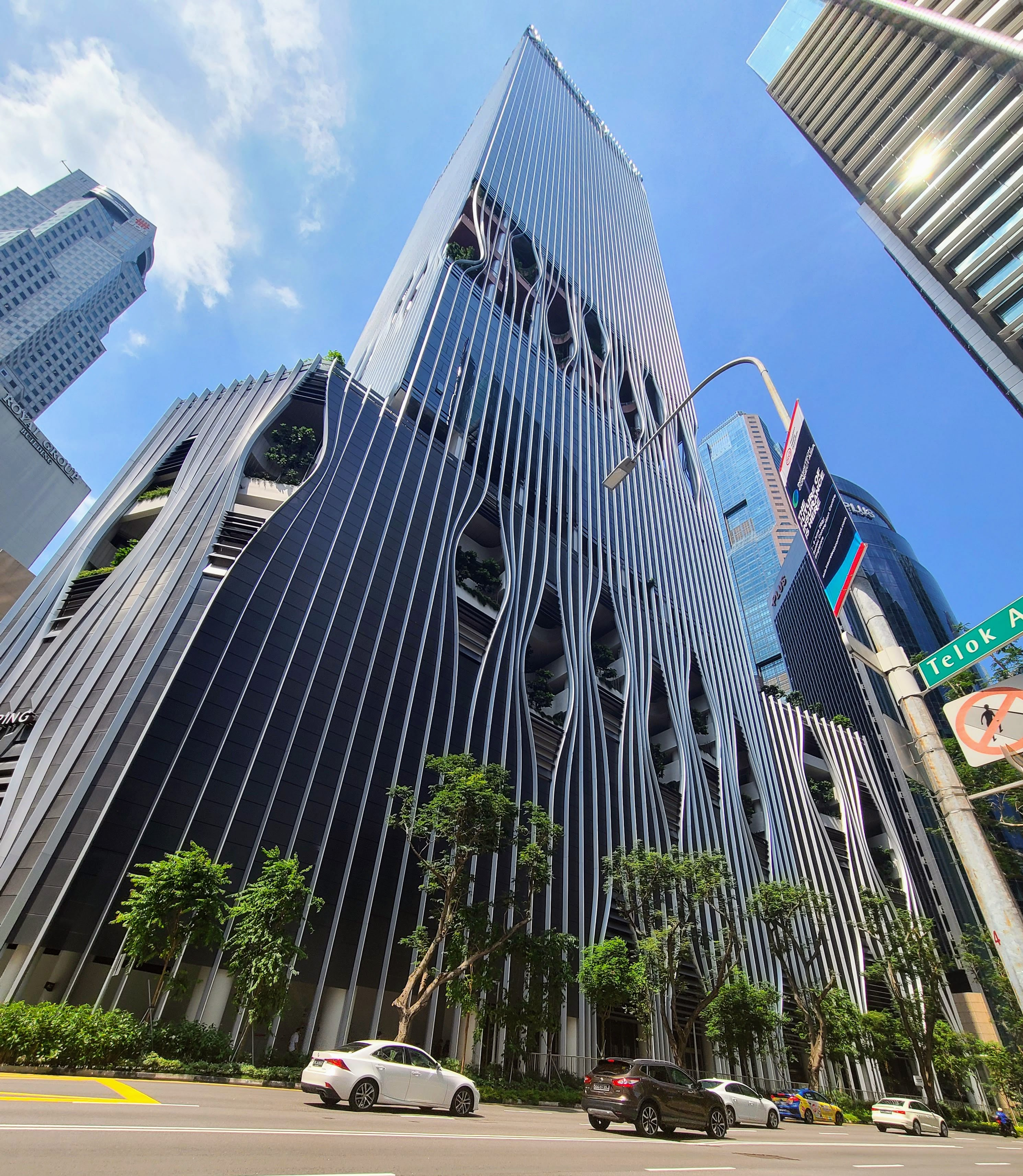
- CapitaSpring in July 2022

General information
- Type: Office and co-working space
- Location: Downtown Core, Singapore, 88 Market Street
- Coordinates: 1.2842°N 103.8502°E
- Construction started: 2018
- Completed: 2021

Technical details
- Floor count: 51

Design and construction
- Architect: Bjarke Ingels Group Carlo Ratti
- Developer: CapitaLand; Mitsubishi Estate
- Main contractor: Dragages Singapore Pte Ltd

CapitaSpring is a skyscraper in Downtown Core, Singapore. The building was designed by architectural firm BIG and architect Carlo Ratti. With a height of 280 m (920 ft), as of 2022, the building is the joint second-tallest in Singapore, with One Raffles Place, United Overseas Bank Plaza One, and Republic Plaza.

== History and construction ==
The project's developers are CapitaLand and Mitsubishi Estate. JPMorgan announced it would take space in the building in 2018, and is the anchor tenant for the project. Other tenants include IBM subsidiary Red Hat, law firms and financial companies.

The building appeared "in the background" of the third season of the television show Westworld.

On 8 April 2022, an engineer died after stepping on a false ceiling panel, which collapsed under her weight. The engineer fell some thirty meters, from the 16th to the 9th floor. Access to the maintenance level was stopped as a result.

== Usage ==
The building is primarily devoted to conventional office space, although about ten percent of the building will contain coworking space. The building also contains a food centre on the second and third floors, including a hawker centre similar to the previous Golden Shoe Car Park, as well as various food and retail options, including a Japanese restaurant, Oumi, on the 51st floor.

There are two gardens in the building, one being 100 metres aboveground and the other Singapore's highest rooftop urban farm, with serviced residences by Citadines taking up the rest of the space.

Access to the offices is via an RFID tag, a QR code from a phone app, a QR code provided by the concierge, or via facial recognition at the turnstiles.

Access to the gardens is restricted since late 2023 as there were too many tourists visiting the gardens previously. For crowd control measures, visitors must book their slot on the CapitaSpring website.

== See also ==
- List of tallest buildings in Singapore
- Architecture of Singapore
