= Raffles Place =

Name transcription(s)
  - Chinese: 萊佛士坊
  - Pinyin: Láifóshì Fāng
  - Malay: Pesara Raffles
  - Tamil: ராஃபிள்ஸ் பிளேஸ்
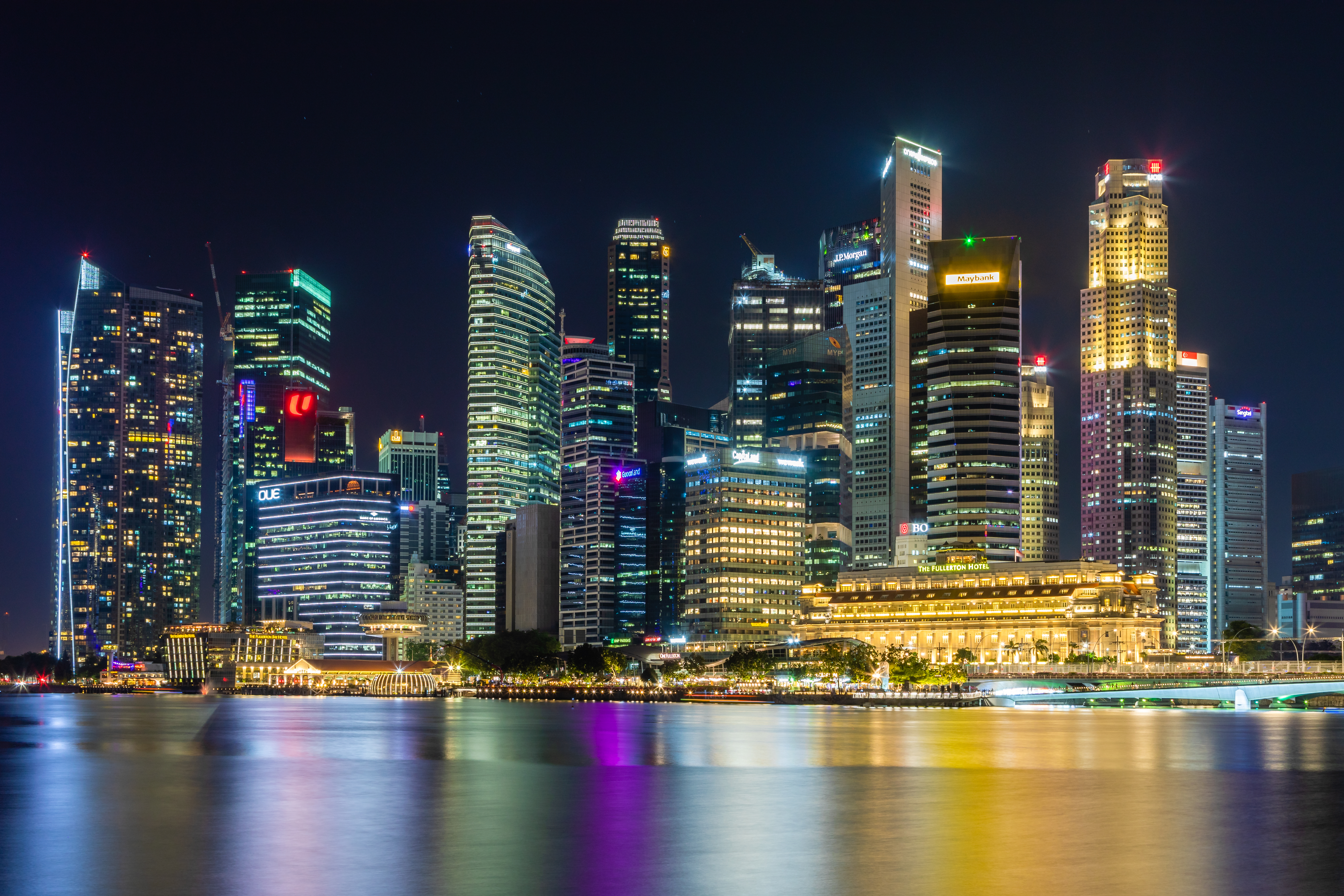
- Skyline of Singapore's Downtown Core

- Location of Raffles Place within Singapore
- Coordinates: 1°17′02″N 103°51′05″E
- Country: Singapore

Government
  - Mayor: Central Singapore CDC: Denise Phua
  - Members of Parliament: Jalan Besar GRC: Josephine Teo

Raffles Place is the centre of the Financial District of Singapore and is located south of the mouth of the Singapore River. It was first planned and developed in the 1820s as Commercial Square to serve as the hub of the commercial zone of Singapore in Raffles Town Plan. It was renamed Raffles Place in 1858 and is now the site of a number of major banks. It is located in the Downtown Core within the Central Area, and features some of the tallest buildings and landmarks of the country.

== History ==
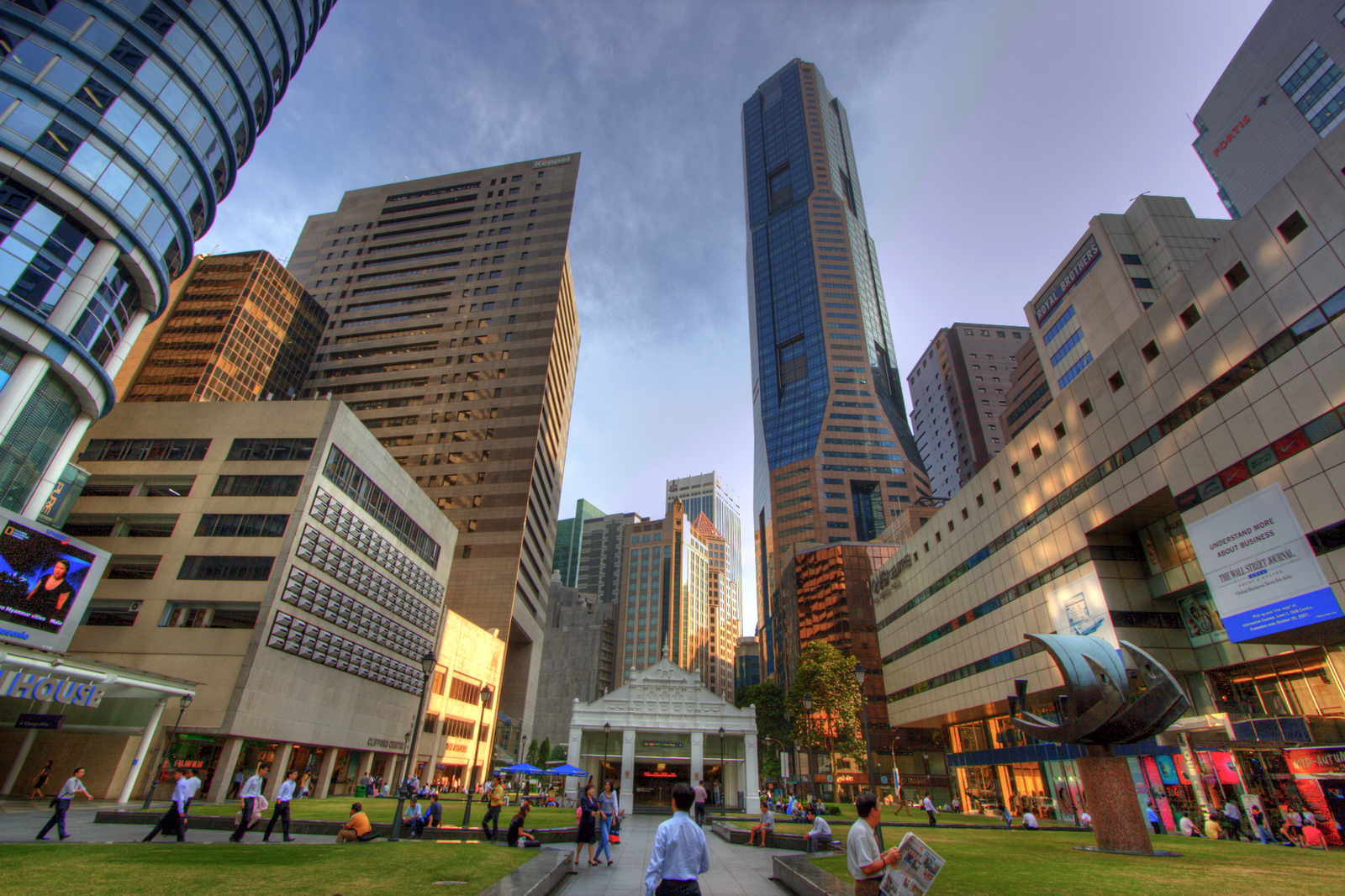
Centre square of Raffles Place

=== Beginning ===
The founder of modern Singapore, Sir Stamford Raffles, intended Singapore to become a "great commercial emporium". As part of his plan, he gave instructions in 1822 that a commercial area to be created on the southwest side of the Singapore River. The Garrison Engineer Lieutenant R.N. Philip Jackson, was tasked with drawing up a Town Plan based on Raffles' instructions. This commercial area was centered on Commercial Square, and was developed from 1823 to 1824.

A small hill originally stood at the area between Commercial Square and Battery Road. Under Raffles' supervision, the hill was leveled, and its soil was then used to reclaim the marshy southern bank of the Singapore River, forming the Boat Quay and Circular Road area. Commercial Square was created as an open space 200 yards long by 50 yards wide, with a small garden in the middle. Land in the area around the square was sold in lots through auction at $1,200 and $1,500 apiece. Commercial enterprises were established in the area; two- and four-storey buildings were built around the square, housing mercantile offices, banks and other financial companies.

On 8 March 1858, Commercial Square was renamed Raffles Place in Raffles' honour. On the south side of the square were many godowns with jetties where cargo can be loaded and unloaded directly from boats as they were then located at the edge of the sea. From 1858 to 1864, the land on the south side of Raffles Place from Johnston's Pier to Telok Ayer Market was reclaimed. The reclaimed land became Collyer Quay, named after the Chief Engineer George Collyer who initiated its construction. The expansion freed up a larger area designated for commerce, and attracted more businesses such as retail stores and banks to the area.

=== Commerce and retail ===
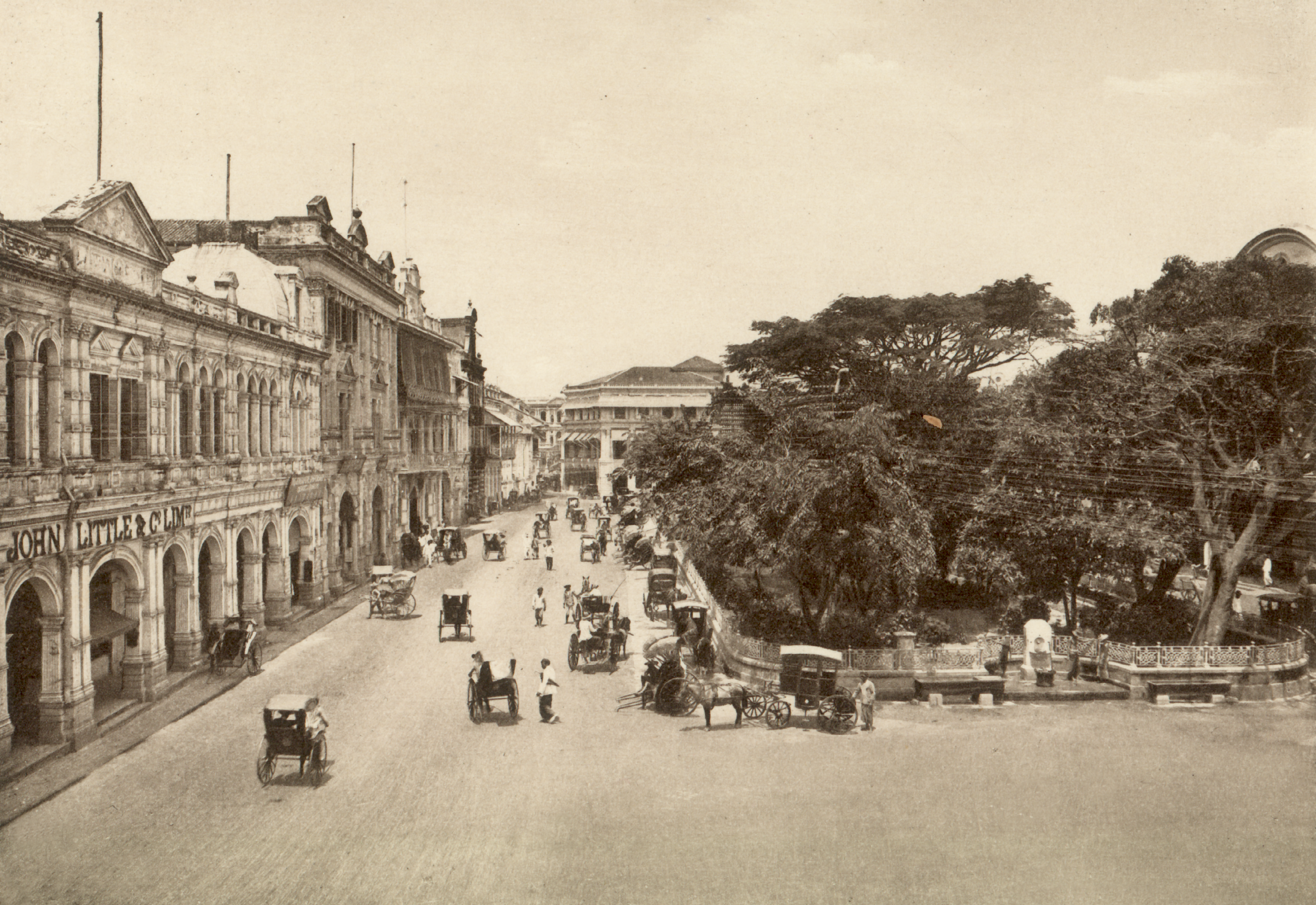
Raffles Place c.1910

The area become the location for well-known retail stores in the 19th century. John Little, Singapore's oldest department store, was established on 30 August 1842 on Commercial Square. Robinsons, another of the early department stores, was first established on Raffles Place in 1858 as a "family warehouse". Robinson's was then relocated elsewhere a few times before returning to Raffles Place in 1891. Whiteaway Laidlaw was first established on D'Almeida Street in 1900 before moving to Stamford House, then to Battery Road in 1910. The Alkaff Arcade, Singapore's first indoor shopping arcade that stretched from the waterfront of Collyer Quay to Raffles Place, was built in 1909. A Chinese store, the Oriental Emporium, was opened opposite Robinsons in 1966.

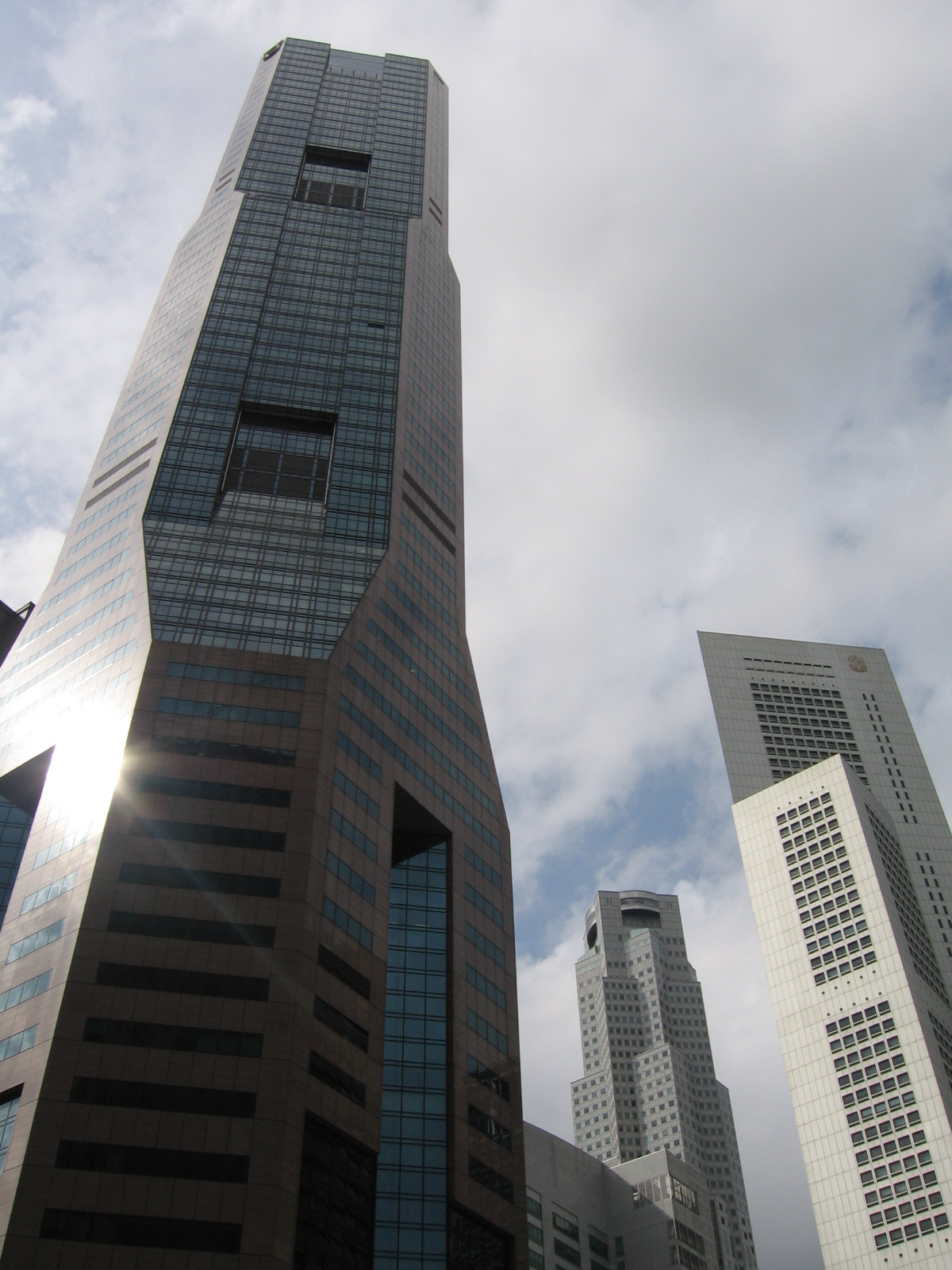
Three of the tallest buildings in Singapore, located at Raffles Place, from left to right, Republic Plaza, UOB Plaza One and One Raffles Place. All three are 280 metres in height.

The earliest banks to operate in Commercial Square were the Oriental Bank, the Chartered Mercantile Bank of India, London and China (later absorbed into HSBC), the Chartered Bank of India, Australia and China (which later became the Standard Chartered), and the Asiatic Banking Corporation. At the turn of the 20th century, the banking industry in Singapore took off. Home-grown banks came into play, competing against bigger banks with lower interest rates and a cultural affinity with their customers. From the 1950s, banking in Singapore entered a new league, with Bank of America establishing itself here in 1955 at 31 Raffles Place, and Bank of China at the adjacent Battery Road.

During World War II, Raffles Place was among the places hit by bombs when seventeen Japanese bombers conducted the first air raid on Singapore on 8 December 1941, during the Battle of Malaya. The Japanese occupation of Singapore temporarily halted the near-continuous commercial development of Raffles Place.

=== Financial hub ===
In the 1960s and 1970s, retailers began to move away from the Raffles Place area to locations such as High Street, North Bridge Road and Orchard Road, and were replaced by finance houses and major banks. The Whiteaway Laidlaw department store building on Battery Road was taken over by Malayan Bank in 1962, and it was later demolished to make way for the Maybank Tower in 1998. Robinsons moved to Orchard Road after its landmark building was destroyed in one of the worst fires in Singapore's history in 1972, and its neighbour Overseas Union Bank expanded into the site with the construction of a new tower in 1986. The John Little's Building was sold in 1973 and demolished.

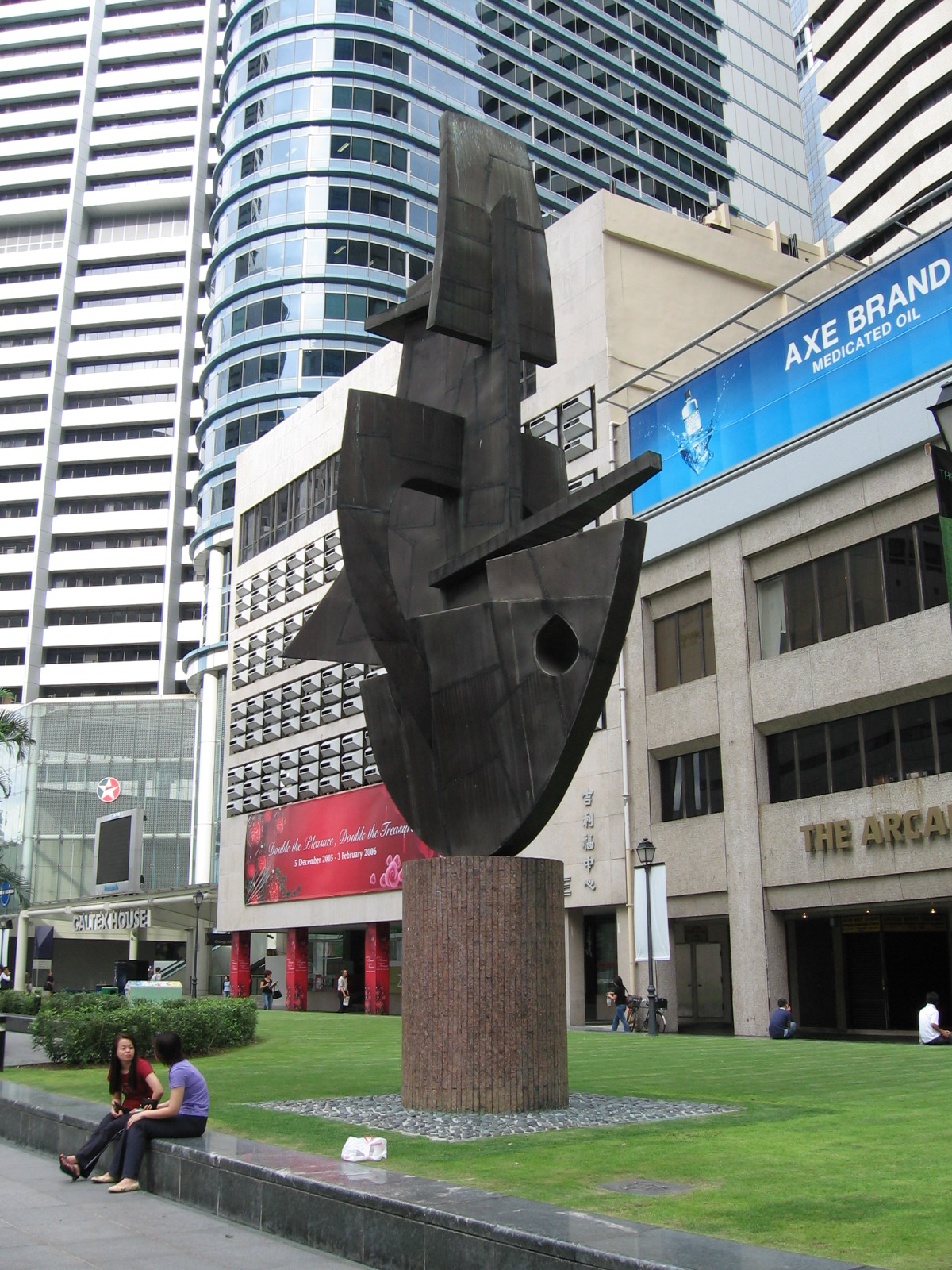
Modern-day Raffles Place, the financial heart of Singapore.

The first underground car park in Singapore was constructed in 1965 under Raffles Place. It was replaced in the 1980s by the Raffles Place MRT station, which opened in December 1987. The station entrance features details from the 1911 facade of the old John Little building.

Raffles Place is now dominated by skyscrapers, many of them among the tallest buildings in Singapore where flagship banks are located. United Overseas Bank tower was completed in 1974 on the old Bonham Building site, later renovated and expanded into UOB Plaza. Other towers such as Singapore Land Tower, Clifford Centre, Ocean Building, OUB Centre, and Republic Plaza have also replaced the older buildings. The three tallest buildings in Singapore were located on Raffles Place the until the construction of Tanjong Pagar Centre in 2016.

== Notable buildings ==
Several key buildings are located in Raffles Place, including UOB Plaza, One Raffles Place, Republic Plaza, Singapore Land Tower and OCBC Centre. The Fullerton Hotel Singapore, a hotel at the renovated old General Post Office building, the famous tourist icon the Merlion, and an ultra modern durian shaped Art Centre Esplanade Theatre are located nearby. The stock exchange of Singapore - the Singapore Exchange - is also located in the vicinity. Several key administrative buildings in Singapore, such as the Parliament House, the Supreme Court and City Hall are located north across the river, but are not part of Raffles Place. The oldest Teochew Temple, Yueh Hai Ching Temple which is built in 1826 and currently managed by Ngee Ann Kongsi is also located near Raffles Place.

== Transportation ==
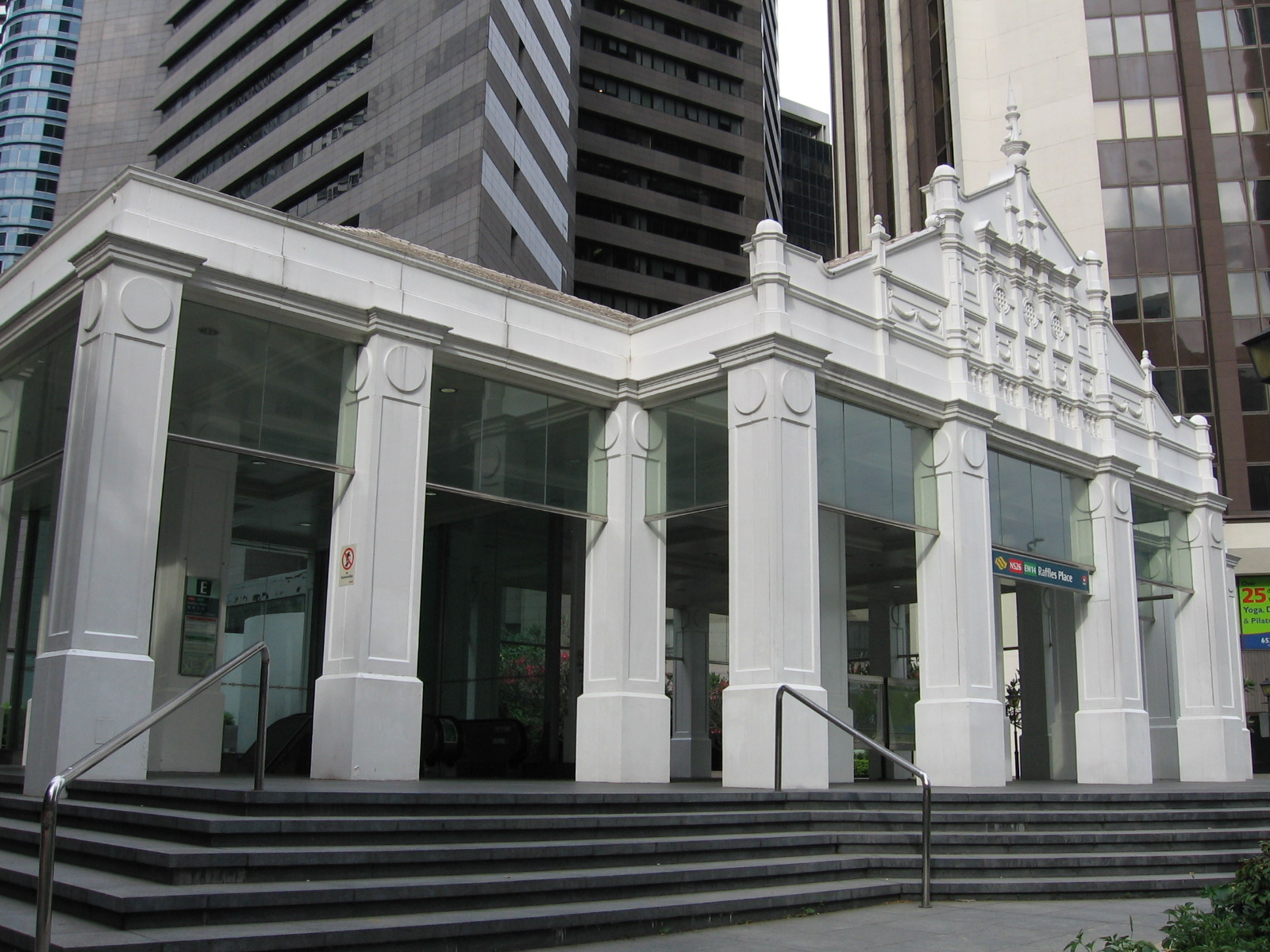
Entrance to Raffles Place MRT Station.

The underground Mass Rapid Transit station, the Raffles Place MRT station, lies directly underneath the centre of Raffles Place, and is one of the primary public transport links for Raffles Place into Singapore's transport system. Bus services also run along Raffles Place.
