= OUE Downtown =

Office skyscrapers in Singapore

OUE Downtown Towers
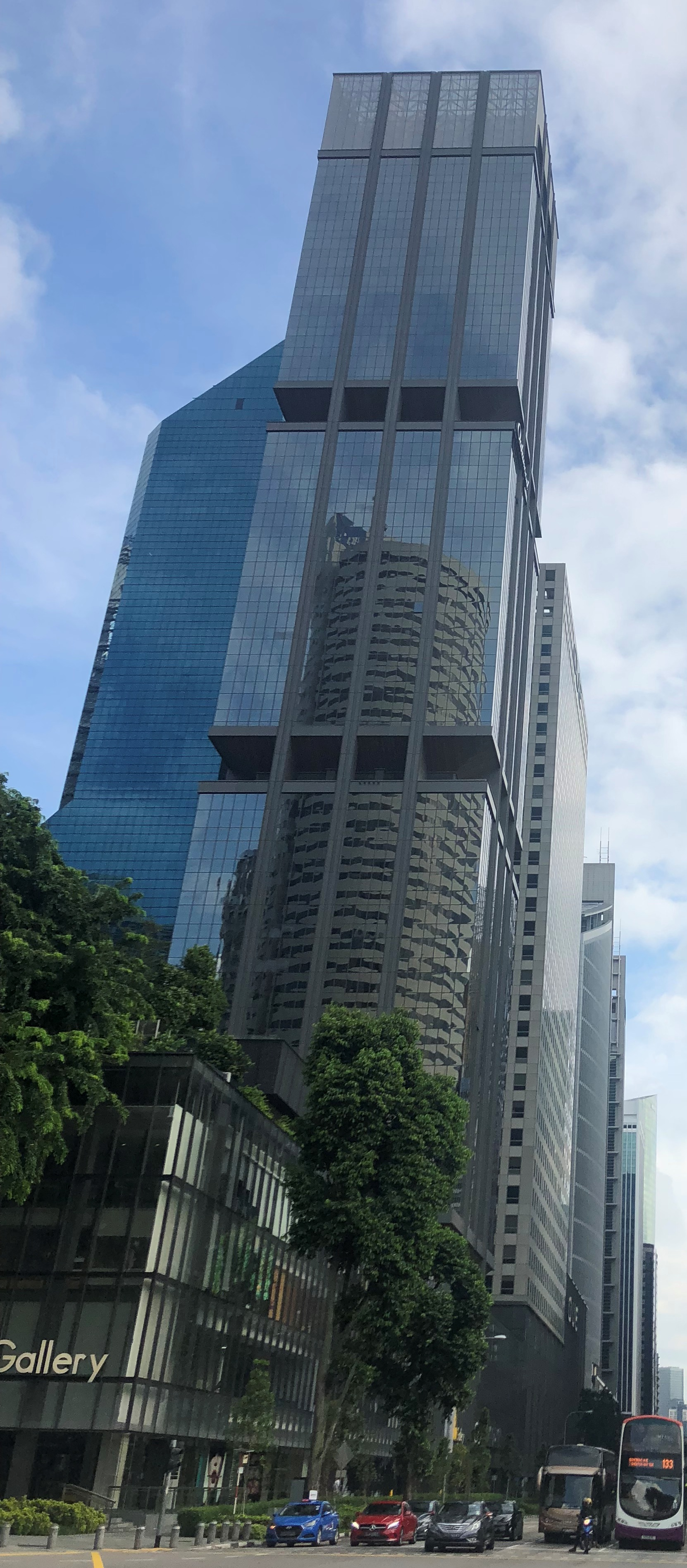
- OUE Tower 1 in 2018
- Interactive map of the OUE Downtown Towers area
- Former names: DBS Building; Development Bank of Singapore Building
- Alternative names: 6 Shenton Way

General information
- Status: Completed
- Type: Commercial offices
- Architectural style: Postmodern architecture
- Location: Shenton Way, Downtown Core, Singapore
- Coordinates: 1.2771°N 103.8483°E
- Construction started: 1972
- Completed: Tower 1: 1975; Tower 2: 1994
- Cost: $24.5 million
- Owner: Overseas Union Enterprise

Height
- Roof: Tower 1: 201 m (659 ft); Tower 2: 150 m (490 ft)

Technical details
- Floor count: Tower 1: 50; Tower 2: 36

Design and construction
- Architects: Architects Team 3 Obayashi Gumi Corporation
- Developer: DBS Land Limited, Ohbayashi Gumi Corporation, Steen Consultants, Liu Cheng Consulting Engineers, Davis Langdon & Seah Philippines Inc., Mitsubishi Elevator and Escalator

Other information
- Public transit: TE19 Shenton Way

OUE Downtown or 6 Shenton Way, formerly DBS Building Towers, is a high-rise skyscraper complex at 6 Shenton Way in the central business district of Singapore. Tower 1, at 201 metres (659 ft) and 50 storeys, was completed in 1975 and is one of Singapore's oldest skyscrapers. Tower 2, at 150 m (490 ft) and 36 storeys, was completed twenty years later in 1994. The former headquarters of DBS Bank was located in the complex. Overseas Union Enterprise (OUE) acquired the complex in 2010 and renamed it 'OUE Downtown'.

== History ==
The DBS Tower One was finished in 1975, together with a wave of brutalist-style buildings, that dominated the 1950s to 1970s period. It was designed by Architects Team 3. Firms involved in the development of the building included DBS Land Limited, Obayashi-Gumi, Ltd., Steen Consultants Private Limited, Liu Cheng Consulting Engineers, Davis Langdon & Seah Philippines Inc., and Mitsubishi Elevator and Escalator.

=== Acquisition by Overseas Union Enterprise ===
The towers were sold to Overseas Union Enterprise (OUE) for S$870.5 million in 2010.

In July 2012, DBS moved out of the towers and into its new headquarters at Marina Bay Financial Centre (MBFC) Tower 3. Various 'core support functions' were relocated to a nine-storey building at Changi Business Park, near the Expo MRT station, in 2010. The Changi site has a permissible gross floor area of some 50,000 m^{2} (540,000 sq ft).

OUE took the opportunity to upgrade the property saying the acquisition was in line with its strategic goal of maximizing investment opportunities from high-yield properties. The property was redeveloped for mixed commercial and residential development. This was in line with OUE's plan to reduce its exposure in the office portfolio and allow it to participate in the residential market, to help lower borrowings and enhance cash flow for the company.

OUE Downtown now consists of the Downtown Gallery shopping mall running the full length of the podium, Tower One contains residential accommodation operated by Oakwood Apartments and Tower Two remains as offices. The Work Project provides co-working space in the Gallery.

== Amenities and architecture ==
DBS Tower One was the first anchor in the financial district of Shenton Way, and was the tallest building in Singapore when it was completed in 1975. It was designed to provide multiple facilities within a single building, and contains facilities like a conference hall, a small theatre and an exhibition centre within the podium.

DBS Tower One is one of the first commercial buildings to incorporate a covered walkway around the whole city block. A series of roof gardens, viewing galleries and outdoor areas provide views and facilities for the enjoyment of its tenants. Together with DBS Building Tower Two, DBS occupies about 56,000 to 70,000 m^{2} (600,000 to 750,000 sq ft) of office space in the central business district. The bank used to own the towers until it sold them to a Goldman Sachs real estate fund in late 2005 and leased back the space it occupied for an initial eight-year term with options for renewal.

The towers are an example of brutalist architecture, and are constructed mainly out of concrete and granite. The architecture of DBS Tower One, together with that of buildings such as the Singapore Land Tower, Temasek Tower and OCBC Centre, dominates the architecture of Singapore. In 2017, Tower One's original aluminium-cladded façade was replaced with a new glass curtain wall façade. It has the world's largest rear projection smart glass display on 400 sqm of switchable glass.

== See also ==
- List of tallest buildings in Singapore

Records
Preceded by United Overseas Bank Plaza Two	Tallest building in Singapore; 201 m (659 ft); 1975–1986	Succeeded by UOB Plaza; One Raffles Place; Republic Plaza
