= UOB Plaza =

Office skyscraper in Singapore

United Overseas Bank Plaza
- Chinese: 大華銀行大厦; Malay: Bangunan Bank UOB; Tamil: யூ.ஓ.பி பிளாசா
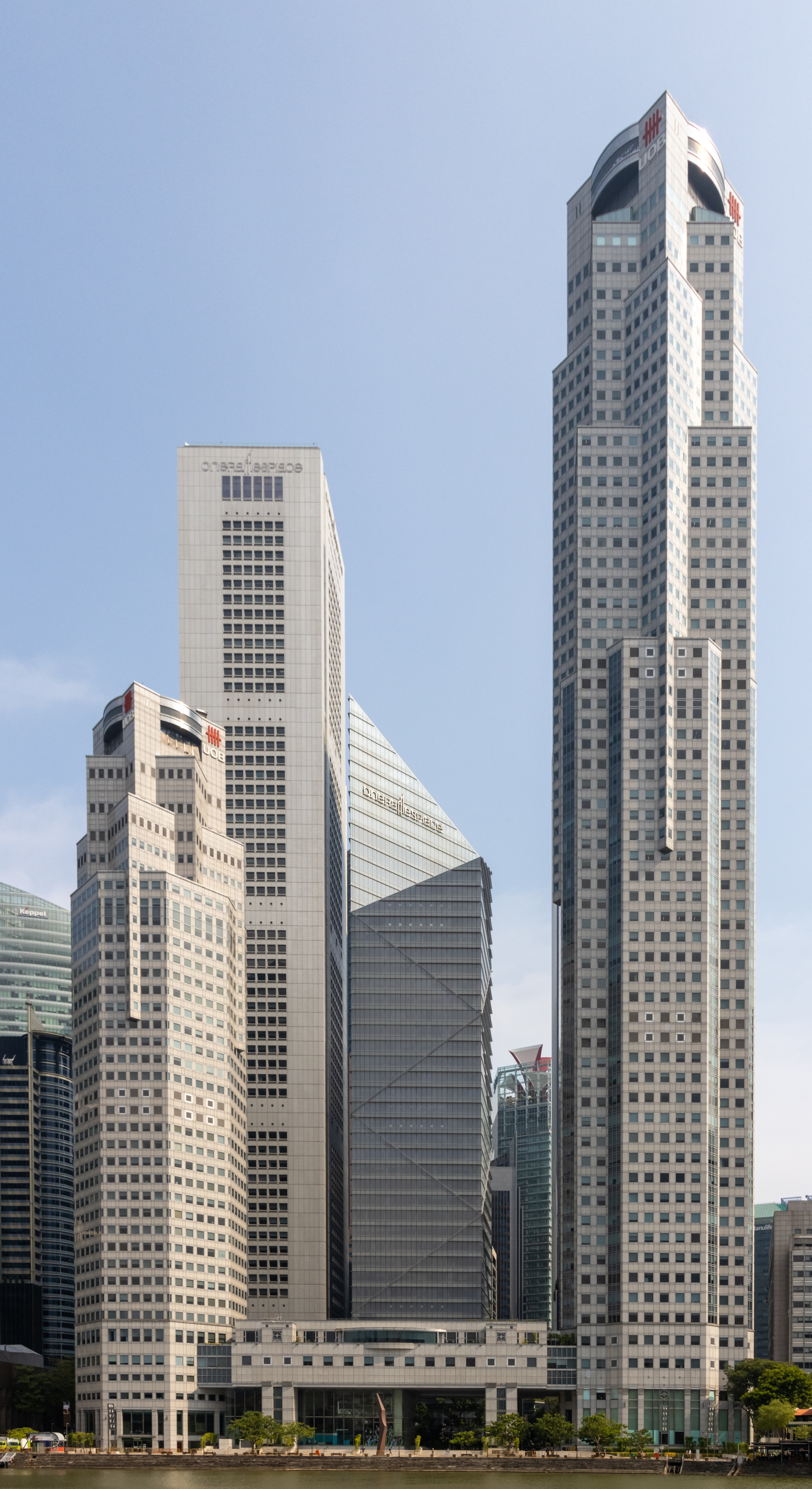
- UOB Plaza in 2023
- Alternative names: United Overseas Bank Plaza

General information
- Type: Commercial offices
- Location: Downtown Core, Singapore
- Coordinates: 1.28555°N 103.84972°E
- Construction started: Plaza One: 1992
- Completed: Plaza One: 1995; Plaza Two: 1973
- Owner: United Overseas Bank
- Operator: United Overseas Bank Property Management

Height
- Roof: Plaza One: 280 m (920 ft); Plaza Two: 162 m (531 ft)

Technical details
- Floor count: Plaza One: 62; Plaza Two: 38
- Floor area: Plaza One: 42,230 m^{2} (454,600 sq ft)

Design and construction
- Architects: Kenzo Tange Associates; Architects 61; Architects Team 3
- Developer: United Overseas Bank
- Structural engineer: Arup
- Main contractor: Nishimatsu Construction; Lum Chang JV

United Overseas Bank Plaza (UOB Plaza) is a commercial complex that consists of twin tower late-modernist skyscrapers in Singapore. At completion, UOB Plaza One was one of the three tallest in the country, sharing the title with the OUB Centre and Republic Plaza; it is now the second tallest since the completion of Tanjong Pagar Centre (Guoco Tower) in 2016. The building was designed by Kenzo Tange, who was commissioned to undertake several large-scale projects in Singapore in the 1980s, including the adjacent OUB Centre.

UOB Plaza Two is a shorter and older building that was completed in 1973 and later renovated in 1995 with a similar facade as UOB Plaza One. Both buildings are connected by a 45 m (148 ft) podium supported by four columns. The podium houses the banking hall of the United Overseas Bank's (UOB) main branch. The building was opened by then Senior Minister Lee Kuan Yew on 6 August 1995 which was 60 years after the founding of UOB.

== Description ==
There are two buildings that make up the Plaza, which are divided into the high-rise "Plaza 1 (UOB Plaza One)" and the low-rise "Plaza (UOB Plaza Two)".

=== UOB Plaza One/UOB P1aza ===
UOB Plaza One is 280 metres (920 ft) high with 66 storeys above ground. It is located at Raffles Place, Singapore's Central Business District (CBD), along the Singapore River. Completed in 1992, it is a box-shaped post-modernism building which was designed by Kenzo Tange, a renowned Japanese architect, and was constructed by Nishimatsu Construction and Lum Chang JV.

Built as the head office of the United Overseas Bank, one of Singapore's leading banks, the building was also one of the country's tallest skyscrapers along with the adjoining OUB Center and Republic Plaza until it was succeeded by the Tanjong Pagar Centre.

The materials, colors, shapes and overall image of the building bares some resemblance to the Tokyo Metropolitan Government Building, which was completed in Shinjuku, Tokyo two years earlier in 1990 and which was also designed by Kenzo Tange himself.

=== UOB Plaza Two/UOB Pla2a ===
UOB Plaza Two or UOB Pla2a is a 162 m (531 ft), 38-storey building . It was first completed in 1973 before it was remodeled in 1995. The extension and renovation of the building, which was completed in 1993, saw the addition of 8 new floors. The building was on the site of the former Bonham Building, which housed the former United Chinese Bank (now the United Overseas Bank). That structure was named UOB Building upon completion, before adopting its current name in 1965.

== History ==
=== Planning and construction of the UOB Building ===
In its 1968 annual report, the United Overseas Bank's (UOB) chairman announced plans to redevelop the bank's current headquarters into a 22-storey building. Subsequently, in June 1970, The Straits Times reported that the plans for the new headquarters comprised a 30-storey, 430 ft (130 m) tall building, to be completed by 1973 at an estimated cost of S$20 million. Construction on the building was underway by January 1972, The incomplete building sustained minor damage from a fire in February 1974, and was completed by July 1974.

The UOB Building, as initially built, occupied a L-shaped, 25,000 square metres (270,000 sq ft) site bounded by Chulia Street, Bonham Street, and Boat Quay. It comprised a five-storey podium and a 25-storey tower. The tower had an octagonal cross-section, and consisted of two tubes, with an exterior tube composed of eight columns and mullions surrounding a reinforced concrete core. Its exterior comprised bare concrete and reflective glass windows, which was intended by the building's architect, Architects Team 3, to give it a "monolithic look". The podium's ground floor was occupied by a 1,030.82 square metres (11,095.7 sq ft) banking hall, while a three-floor underground carpark with a capacity of 183 vehicles was located beneath the podium. Upon opening, UOB occupied the lower 14 floors of the building, while several floors were occupied by the Shell Group.

=== Conception and planning for UOB Plaza ===
In UOB's 1981 annual report, then-UOB chairman Wee Cho Yaw disclosed plans for the construction of a new headquarters building. Expected to be built on a 8,420 m^{2} (90,600 sq ft) plot beside the UOB Building, it was to consist of a podium and a 60-floor tower block, and was named UOB Plaza. Nevertheless, in September 1983, UOB halted the project, which the bank attributed to the poor performance of the Singapore property market at that time, and to the S$118 million development charge it had to pay to the Ministry of National Development to construct the building. UOB then commissioned Kenzo Tange and Archiplan Team, a local architectural firm, to submit revised plans for the building.

The UOB Plaza project was restarted in 1988, with the Business Times reporting in February 1988 that construction of the building was to commence in the middle of the year. According to UOB, the decision to restart was made as they expected to pay a lower development charge, due to lower property prices and a reduction of the levy from 70% to 50% of the increase in land value, and better responses from tenants after the opening of the Mass Rapid Transit system in the Central Area.

The revised development comprised a 280 metres (920 ft), 63-storey tower that was to be connected to the UOB Building by a six-floor podium, while the UOB Building was to be renovated to fit in with the tower and podium. Expected to cost about S$400 million, the project was to be completely funded by the bank from its revenue and reserves. In addition, the bank stated that they did not plan to sell any office space in the new building, since they saw it as a long-term investment.

=== Construction of UOB Plaza ===
Work on UOB Plaza commenced in July 1988, and construction of the building's foundations and basements, which had been contracted out for S$31 million to a 50-50 joint venture between Japanese contractor Nishimatsu and Lum Chang Holdings, started in November 1988. The tender for the building's superstructure was called in July 1989, while the S$36 million tender for the supply of structural steel was awarded to NKK Corporation in the next month. Seen as the top construction contract of 1989 by the construction industry, according to The Straits Times, the superstructure tender attracted bids from several joint ventures between Singaporean and Japanese construction firms. In January 1990, The Business Times reported that the superstructure contract had been awarded to the Lum Chang-Nishimatsu joint venture, which UOB subsequently denied. The superstructure tender was then awarded to the Lum Chang-Nishimatsu joint venture for about S$280 million in February 1990.

In February 1990, The Business Times reported that UOB was expected to pay S$90 million to the Singapore government, comprising a S$30 million development charge and S$60 million to purchase the section of Market Street that ran through the UOB Plaza site, and that UOB had made an appeal regarding the development charge. UOB settled the matter with the government by May 1990, agreeing to pay a S$29 million development charge and S$58 million for a 999-year lease for the section of Market Street to be occupied by the building. Construction of the building's superstructure began in July 1990, with the steel frame in place by September 1991, and the building was completed in November 1992.

Details on the UOB Building's renovation were revealed to the media by UOB in December 1991. Comprising six more floors and a new exterior, UOB estimated it to cost S$82 million Carried out by a joint venture between George Wimpey and Woh Hup, the renovation commenced in April 1993, concluding in May 1995. After the renovation, the UOB Building was renamed UOB Plaza Two.

The building was officially opened by then-Senior Minister Lee Kuan Yew on 6 August 1995, UOB's 60th anniversary.

== Gallery ==
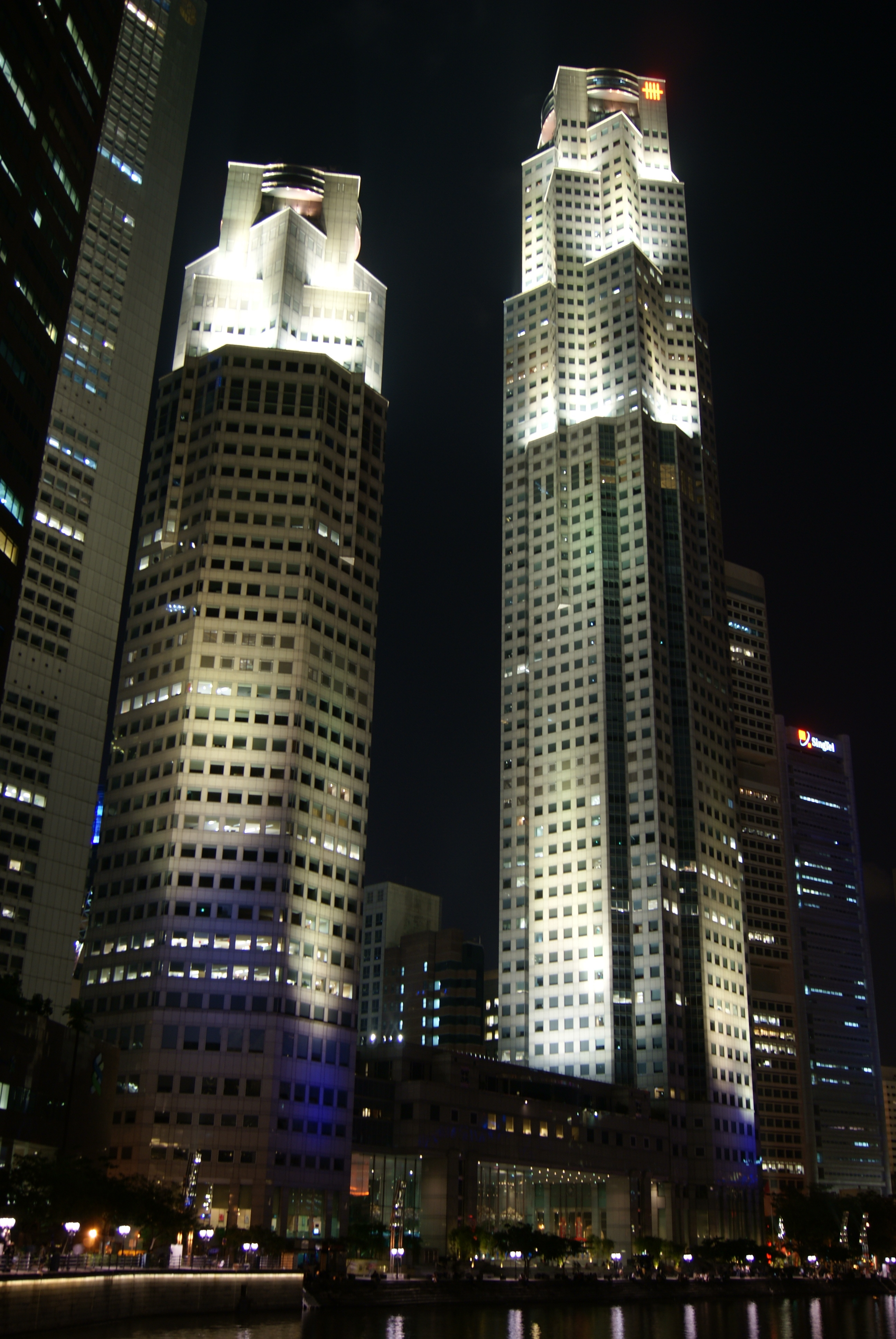
Special occasion floodlighting up the building at night

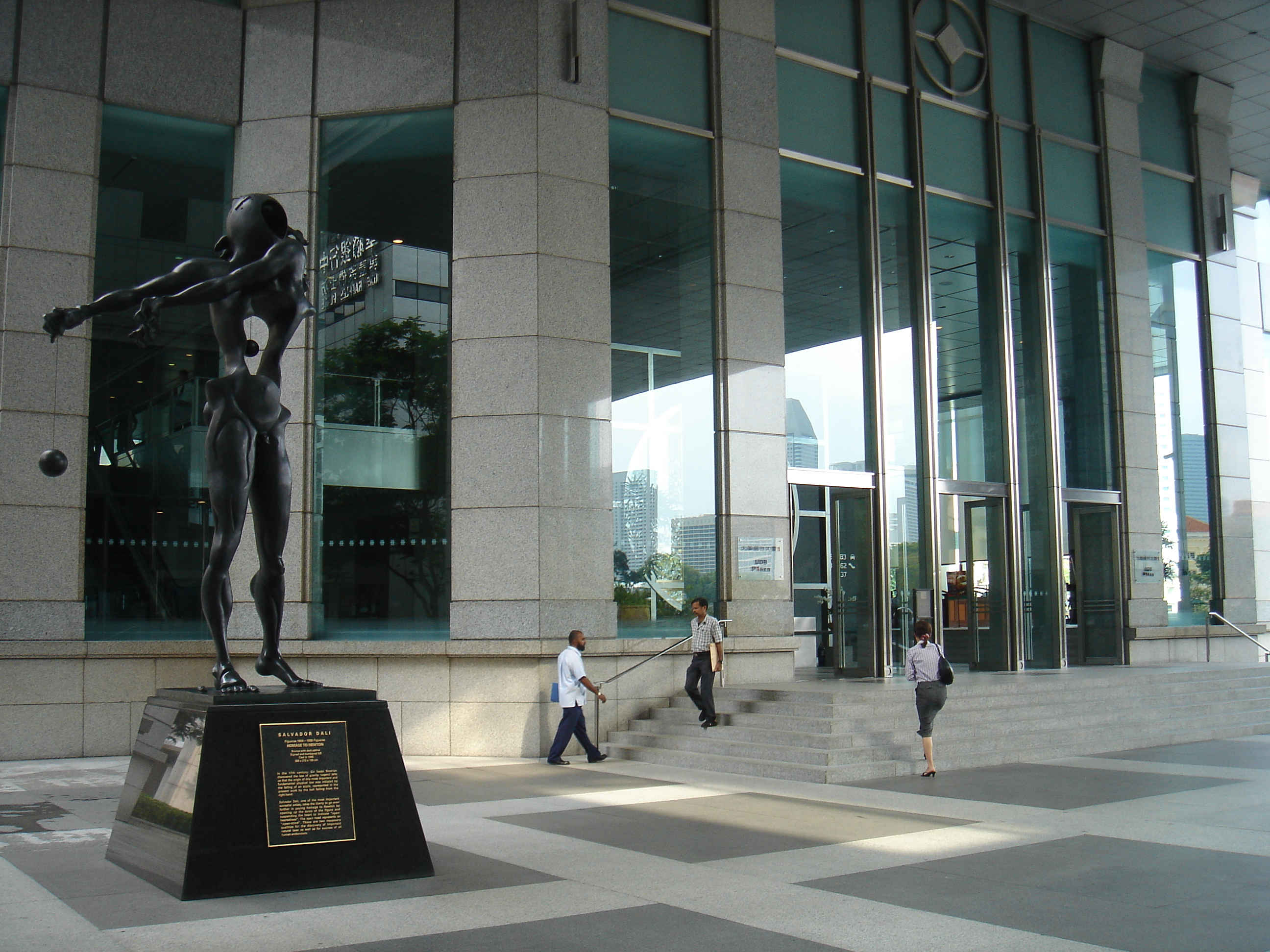
UOB Plaza One's entrance with a sculpture by Salvador Dalí

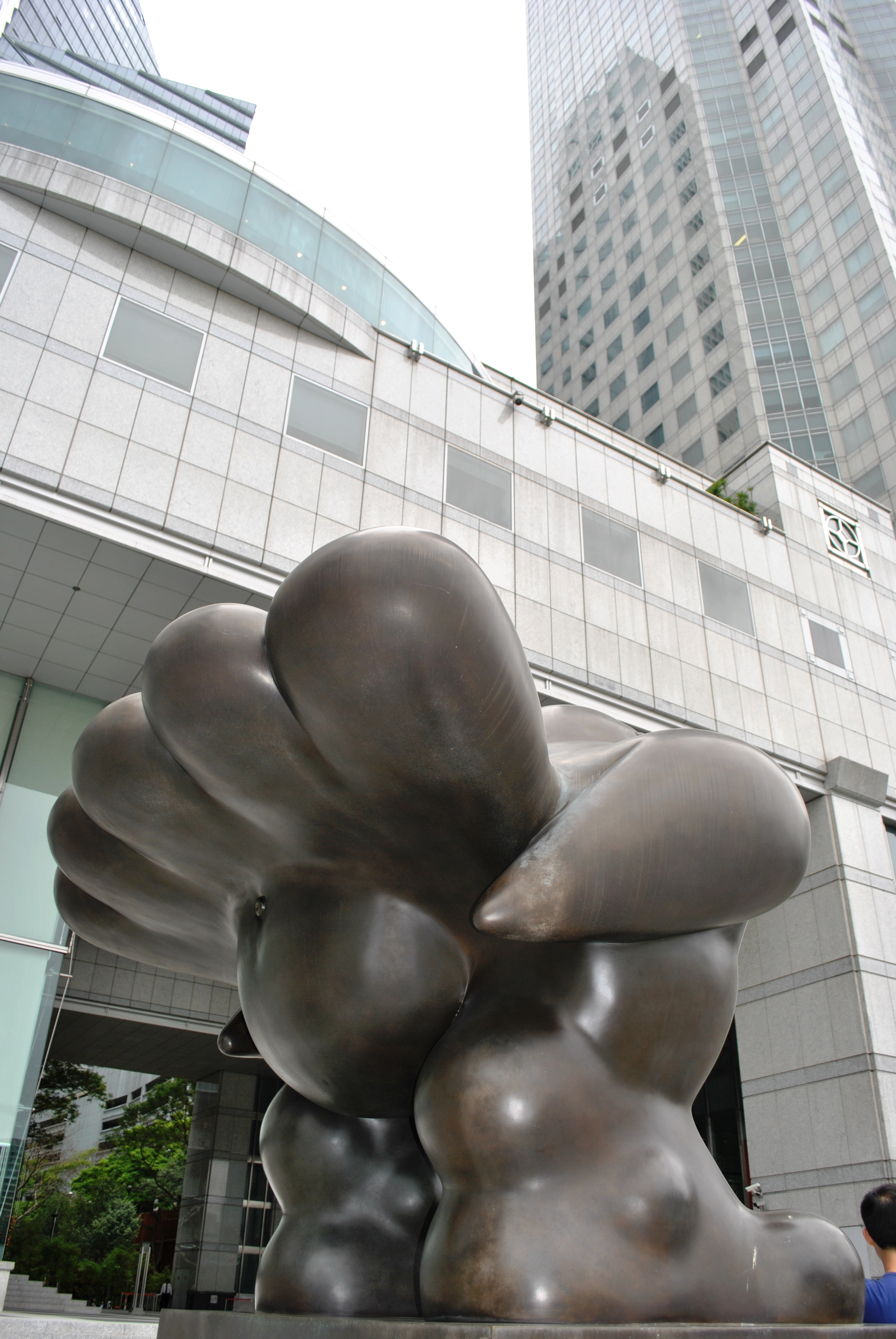
UOB Plaza One with a sculpture by Fernando Botero

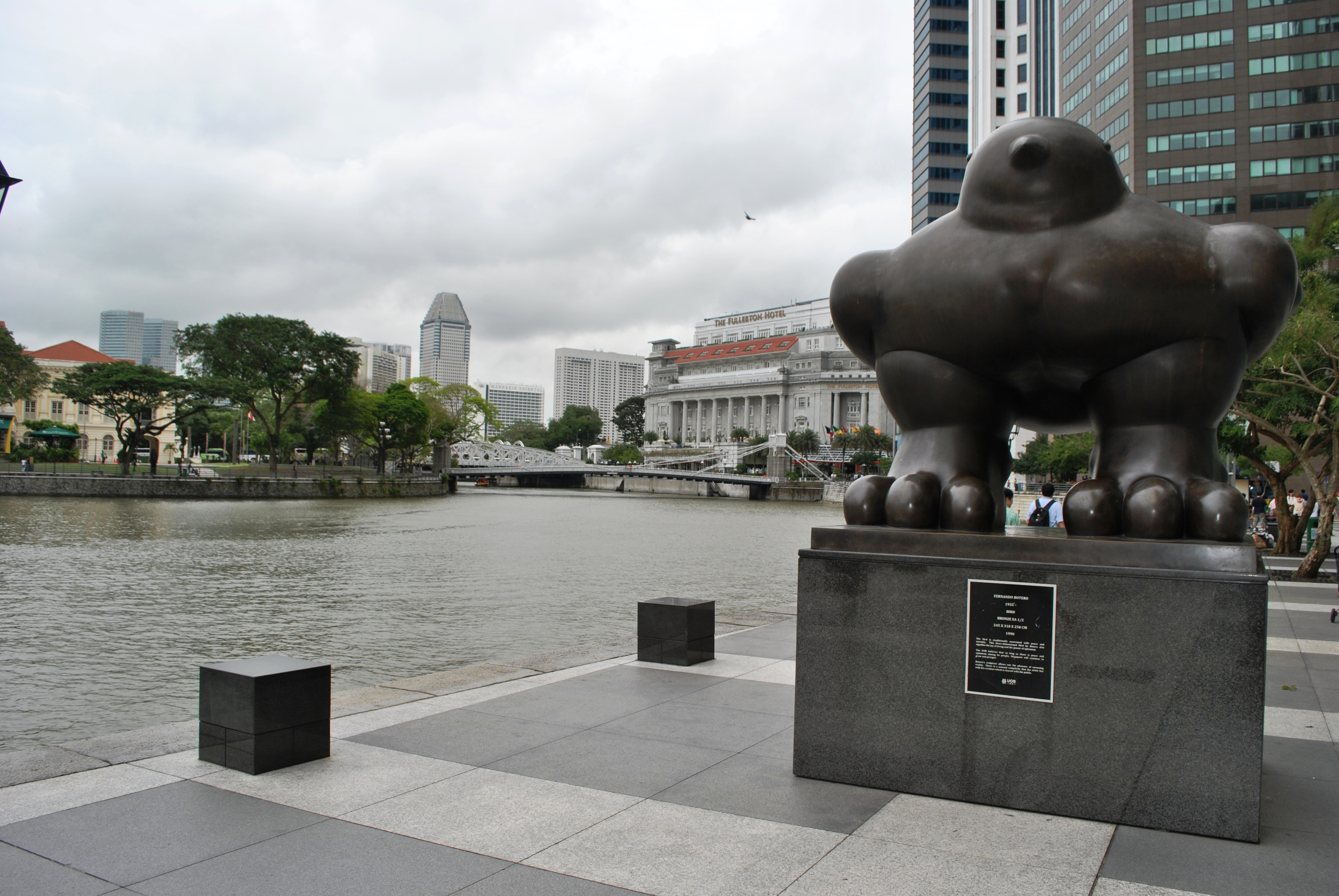
Sculpture by Fernando Botero

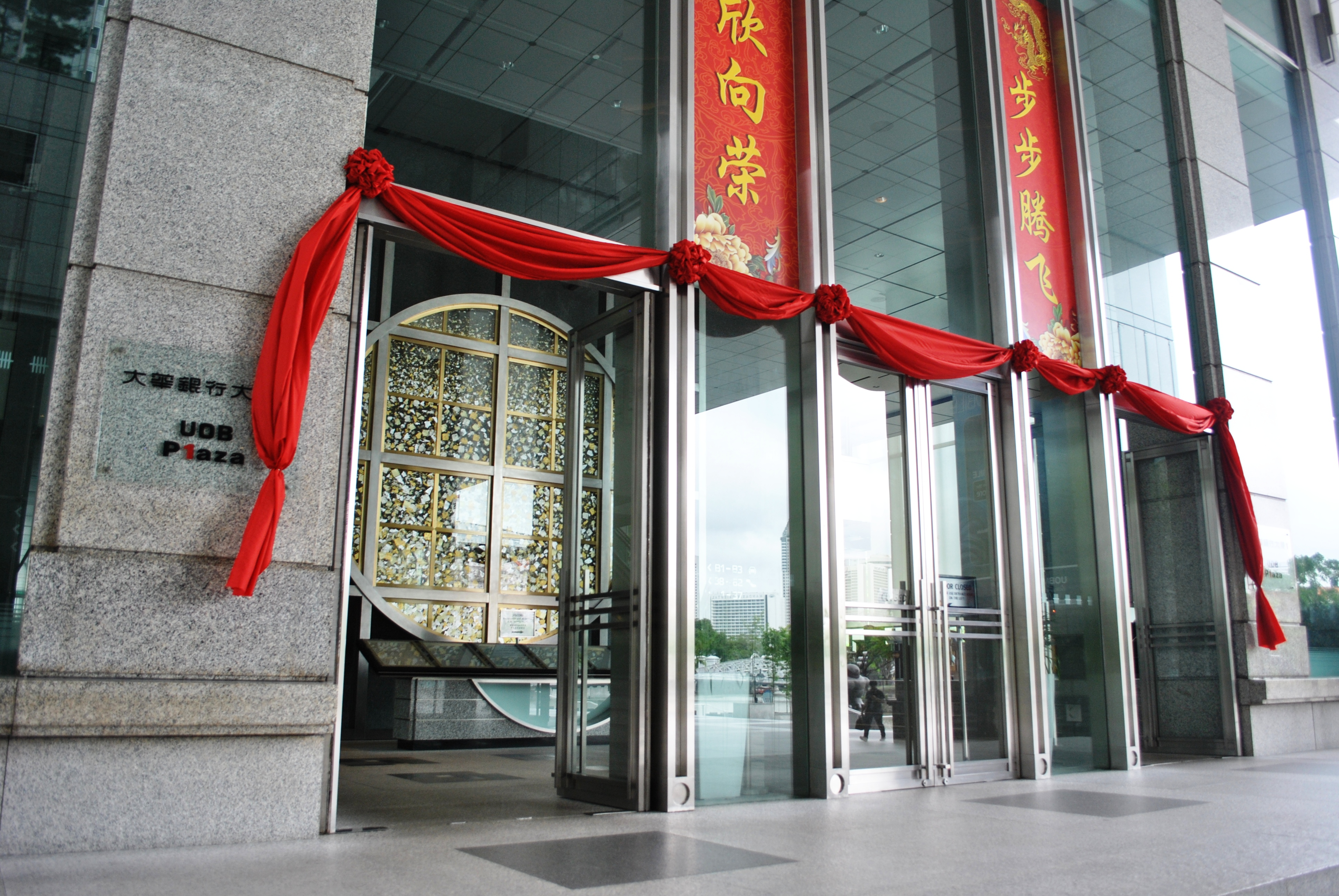
UOB Plaza One's entrance

== See also ==
- Tallest buildings in Singapore
- List of tallest freestanding steel structures
- Robot Building – UOB's Thailand headquarters
- Thamrin Nine – UOB's Indonesia Headquarters

Records
Preceded by Meritus Mandarin Singapore Tower Two; UIC Building	Tallest building in Singapore; 162 m (531 ft); 1974–1975	Succeeded by DBS Building Tower One
Preceded by DBS Building Tower One	Tallest building in Singapore; 280 m (920 ft); 1992–2016	Succeeded by Guoco Tower
