= Singapore Land Tower =

Office skyscraper in Singapore

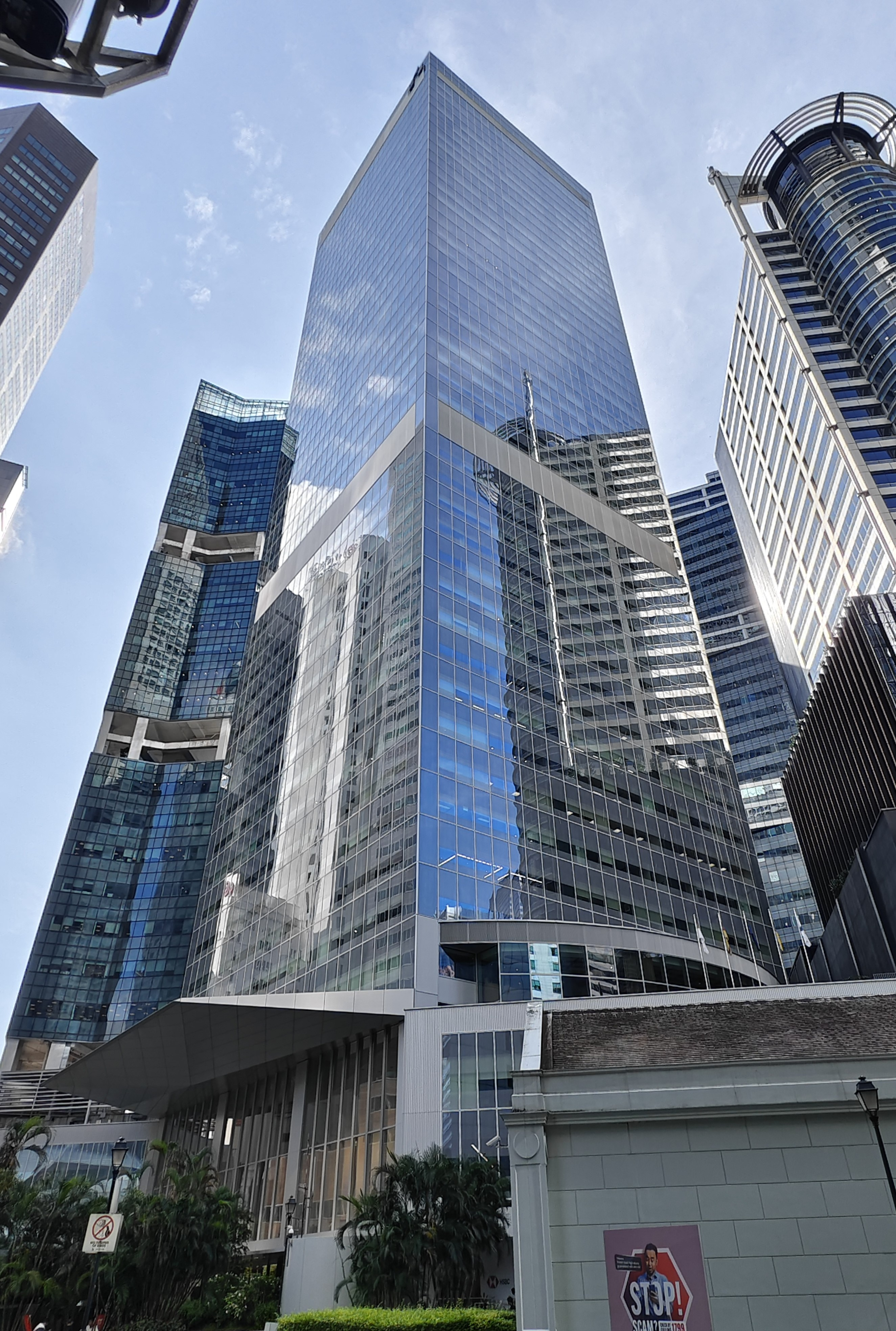
- Refurbished Singapore Land Tower in September 2025
- Interactive map of the Singapore Land Tower area
- Alternative names: 50 Raffles Place; Shell Tower

General information
- Type: Commercial offices Government offices
- Architectural style: Brutalist architecture
- Location: Raffles Place, Downtown Core, Singapore
- Coordinates: 1.2846°N 103.8518°E
- Completed: 1980
- Owner: Singapore Land Limited

Height
- Roof: 190 m (620 ft)

Technical details
- Floor count: 48
- Floor area: 620,000 sq ft (58,000 m^{2})

Design and construction
- Architects: P & T Architects & Engineers Limited; Architects 61 Private Limited

Singapore Land Tower is a 48-storey 190 m (620 ft) skyscraper located in the central business district of Singapore. The tower is located at 50 Raffles Place, adjacent to Raffles Place MRT station. It is just 100 metres away from Boat Quay and Collyer Quay.

The Embassy of Germany is located on the 28th floor, Embassy of Ukraine is on the 16th floor and the Embassy of Colombia occupies the 30th floor of the building.

== History ==
Construction on the Singapore Land Tower was completed in 1980. The tower underwent alteration and recladding works as well as a new roofing feature of which the works received statutory completion status in August 2003.

Companies involved in the development of the building included Singapore Land Limited, CapitaLand Limited, Rider Hunt Levett & Bailey, Mitsubishi Elevator and Escalator, Architects 61 Pte Ltd, Colliers International (Singapore) Private Limited, Hong Kong Trade Development Council, SEB and The Boston Consulting Group.

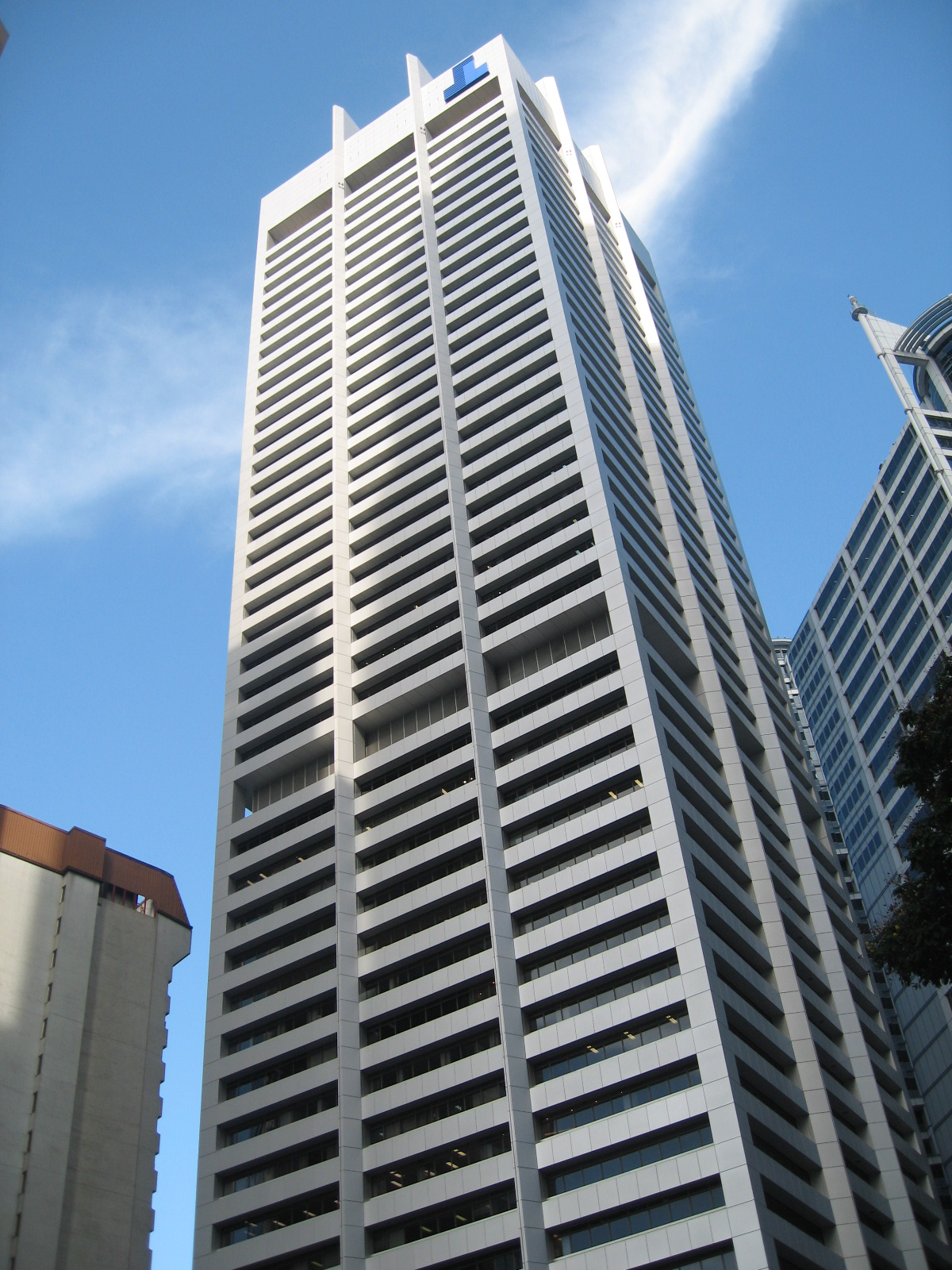
Another view of Singapore Land Tower

== See also ==
- List of tallest buildings in Singapore
