= Republic Plaza (Singapore) =

Office skyscraper in Singapore

- Chinese: 共和大廈; Malay: Plaza Republik; Tamil: குடியரசு கட்டிடம்
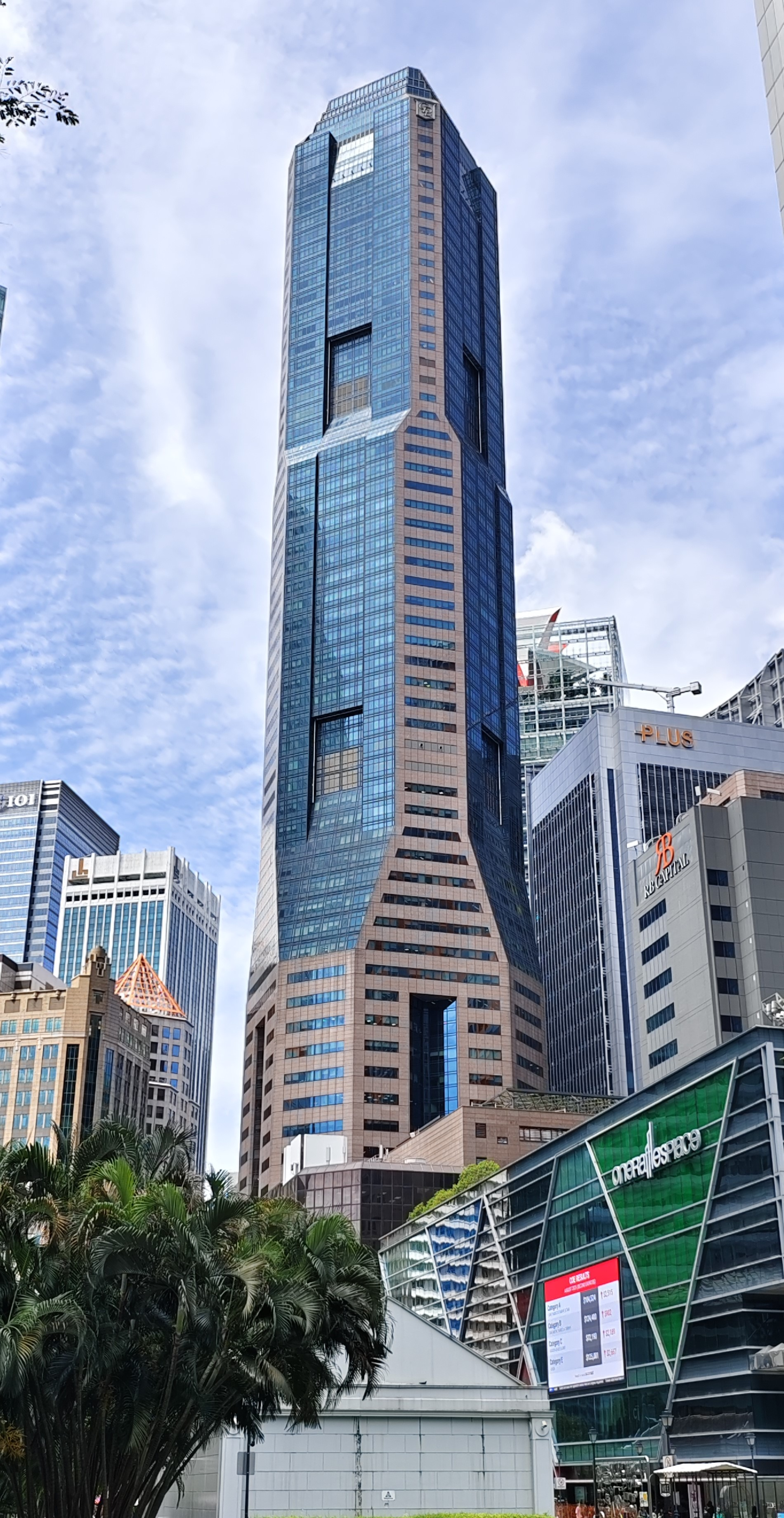
- Republic Plaza in September 2025
- Interactive map of the Republic Plaza area

General information
- Type: Commercial property Retail
- Location: 9 Raffles Place, Singapore 048619
- Coordinates: 1°16′58″N 103°51′04″E
- Construction started: 1991; 35 years ago
- Completed: 1996; 30 years ago (Official opening in 1998)
- Owner: City Developments Limited
- Operator: City Developments Limited

Height
- Roof: 280 m (920 ft)

Technical details
- Floor count: 66
- Floor area: 102,899 m^{2} (1,107,600 sq ft)

Design and construction
- Architects: Kisho Kurokawa Architects & Associates; RSP Architects Planners & Engineers
- Developer: City Developments Limited
- Main contractor: Shimizu Corporation

Republic Plaza is a skyscraper in Downtown Core, Singapore. It comprises two towers and a 10-storey podium. The first tower, Republic Plaza I, has 66 floors and a height of 280 metres (920 ft), and has a varying octagonal-cross section, while its interior allows for flexible space usage by tenants. The second tower, Republic Plaza II, is 23 stories tall, while the podium contains a three-floor retail area.

Initially conceived by Jones Lang Wootton in the mid-1980s, development of Republic Plaza was to be carried out by a joint venture between C. Itoh, Land Equity, and several other Japanese firms. However, in July 1987, City Developments Limited (CDL) purchased two plots on the planned site of the development, and started negotiations with the partners in the joint venture regarding jointly developing the building, which resulted in CDL taking a 50% stake in the project. Further land acquisition for the project was carried out between 1987 and 1989. Construction began in December 1991, and the first tower was completed by December 1995. Plans for the second tower were drawn up after a change in the gross floor calculation by the Urban Redevelopment Authority in 1993 allowed for its construction without additional development charges. Construction of the second tower commenced in November 1995, and it was completed by January 1997. CDL bought out the other partners' stakes in February 1996, and Republic Plaza was officially opened on 25 January 1998. After several major tenants moved out of the building in the mid-2010s, CDL renovated Republic Plaza from 2018 to 2019 for S$70 million.

== Description ==
Republic Plaza consists of three buildings, the 66-storey Republic Plaza I, the 23-storey Republic Plaza II, and a 10-storey podium linking the two towers (Plaza I and Plaza II) Republic Plaza I was designed by Kisho Kurokawa, and with a height of 280 metres (920 ft), was, along with OUB Centre, and UOB Plaza, the tallest building in Singapore at the time of its completion. It comprises a moment-resisting frame and a central core, and has a varying octagonal cross-section, with the longer sides on the upper floors turned 45 degrees from those at street level. The tower's exterior comprises polished granite and blue glass panels. The tower's interior was designed for flexible use of space by tenants, and allowed for the retrofitting of inter-floor connections where necessary. In addition, like other skyscrapers built in Singapore during that time, such as the Millenia Tower, the tower featured computer-controlled centralised building management systems, and raised flooring, within which utilities were run.

Republic Plaza II faces Malacca Street, and rises from the 10-storey podium. The complex also includes a three-floor, 241,000 square feet (22,400 m^{2}) retail area, and its basement is linked to Raffles Place MRT station.

Republic Plaza was constructed using labour-saving techniques such as prefabrication, allowing for reduced construction times and building costs. For these methods, along with its modular design, the building received the top prize in Fiabci's Best of the World Real Estate competition in May 1997.

== History ==
=== Planning ===
The Republic Plaza project was initially conceptualised by Jones Lang Wootton (JLW) in the mid-1980s. The development comprised 3 blocks of 62, 11, and eight floors, and was to occupy a 7,800 square metres (84,000 sq ft) site bounded by Malacca, Cecil, Market, and D’Almeida streets. It was to be developed by a joint venture between a consortium of several Japanese firms, including C. Itoh, and Land Equity. Details of the project were first disclosed in a report by The Straits Times in March 1987, which noted that it had been in the works for at least six months.

In the same report, The Straits Times mentioned that the joint venture was planning to take over two plots on the Republic Plaza site from the Overseas Chinese Banking Corporation and Great Eastern Life. These two plots were bought by City Developments Limited (CDL) in July 1987 for S$51 million, in, according to Lee Han Shih of The Business Times, an attempt by CDL to get a stake in Republic Plaza's development. CDL promptly started talks with the joint venture over jointly developing Republic Plaza. The talks concluded in April 1988 with an agreement, under which CDL took a 50% stake in the project, while the other partners, C. Itoh, Land Equity, and Shimizu Corporation, had stakes of 23%, 20%, and 7% respectively. The other partners were also expected to sell their stakes to CDL once the development was completed. Land Equity subsequently withdrew from the Republic Plaza project in January 1990, selling its stake to CDL for S$19 million.

While negotiations with CDL were underway, the C. Itoh-Land Equity joint venture continued acquiring land for Republic Plaza, purchasing five plots on the development's planned site in December 1987 for about S$64 million. CDL made further land purchases at the development's site after it took a stake in the project, purchasing the CYS building at the junction of Malacca and Market Streets for S$16 million in October 1988, followed by the adjacent FIDVI Building for S$17 million in March 1989. In addition, in an Urban Redevelopment Authority (URA) land sale in June 1989, CDL bid S$140 million for a 2,366 square metres (25,470 sq ft) plot adjacent to the Republic Plaza site along Cecil Street with the intention of incorporating it into the development, but it was outbid by DBS Land and Straits Steamship Land. Following this, CDL announced in January 1990 that it had revised the plans for Republic Plaza to exclude the state land along Cecil Street and include the sites of the CYS Building and FIDVI Building.

To fund the project, the partners negotiated with several banks for a loan facility worth about S$600 million. The Business Times reported that, according to several bankers that it spoke to, the loan facility was to comprise three tranches, which were to be provided by several Japanese leasing firms, such as Showa Leasing and Century, several Japanese banks, like the Bank of Tokyo, Sumitomo and Mitsubishi Banks, and by several Singapore-based Japanese banks and a Singaporean bank, respectively. The loan facility, with a final value of S$630 million, was secured by November 1990.

=== Construction ===
Republic Plaza's groundbreaking ceremony was conducted on 10 December 1991, and foundation works commenced in the same month. The foundations were completed in December 1992, and construction of Republic Plaza’s superstructure was underway by January 1993. JLW, which acted as the development's marketing agent, had started negotiations with several potential tenants by June 1994, and the building's steel frame was completed in December 1994. With the completion of Republic Plaza's superstructure, the partners held a topping out ceremony for the development in March 1995, and the completed tower received its temporary occupation permit in December 1995.

While the first tower was under construction, plans were drawn up for a second tower for the development, details of which were reported in The Business Times in April 1995. 10-12 storeys high, the tower was to have 85,000 square feet (7,900 m^{2}) of lettable space. The Business Times also reported that the decision to build the second tower was made after URA changed the gross floor area calculation for buildings to include lift shafts only for the ground floor, allowing the joint venture to build the second tower without incurring additional charges. Work on the second tower commenced in November 1995, and it received its temporary occupation permit in January 1997.

To finance the second tower's construction, and to refinance its existing loans for the development, CDL announced in November 1995 that it would be raising S$280 million in fixed rate bonds, and would be taking a S$420 million term loan facility arranged by Citicorp from several banks. According to CDL, both schemes were well-received, and it had secured all the money by January 1996. In addition, in accordance with the 1988 agreement made between the partners, CDL bought out C. Itoh's and Shimizu's stakes in the development in February 1996 for S$47.1 million.

Republic Plaza was officially opened by then-Prime Minister Mr Goh Chok Tong on 25 January 1998. At the time of its opening, the development had a total of 800,000 square feet (74,000 m^{2}) of lettable space, large portions of which were leased by banks such as Bank of Tokyo-Mitsubishi, which also had a banking hall in the building, Bank of America, ING-Barings and Rabobank.

=== The 2010s ===
In the mid-2010s, with the development of new office buildings in Singapore, several major tenants in Republic Plaza chose to move out instead of renewing their leases. The Business Times reported in February 2016 that Bank of Tokyo-Mitsubishi UFJ was planning to move to Marina One, while by September, Itochu had secured office space in Guoco Tower, and ING was in talks regarding a move to the same building. ING and Itochu moved out of Republic Plaza in the third quarter of 2017, followed by Bank of Tokyo-Mitsubish UFJ, until then the building's main tenant, by the end of that year. Subsequently, around 60,000 square feet (5,600 m^{2}) of the vacated office space was taken up by co-working operator Distrii, which opened a co-working space at Republic Plaza in May 2018.

In light of the major tenants moving out of the building that year, in February 2017, CDL announced plans to refurbish Republic Plaza upon the departure of the major tenants in an attempt to bring the building in line with the latest office buildings in Singapore. Costing S$70 million, the refurbishment works were carried out between April 2018 and September 2019. These works comprised upgrading of the lifts, lobbies, and common areas, work was also carried out at the retail podium, with 3,400 square feet (320 m^{2}) of carpark space converted to retail, and existing retail areas were upgraded to handle higher footfall and to allow for more food and beverage outlets.

== See also ==
- List of tallest buildings in Singapore
- Architecture of Singapore

Records
Preceded by DBS Building Tower One	Tallest building in Singapore; 280 m (920 ft); 1995–2016	Succeeded by Guoco Tower
