= Guoco Tower =

Office skyscraper in Singapore

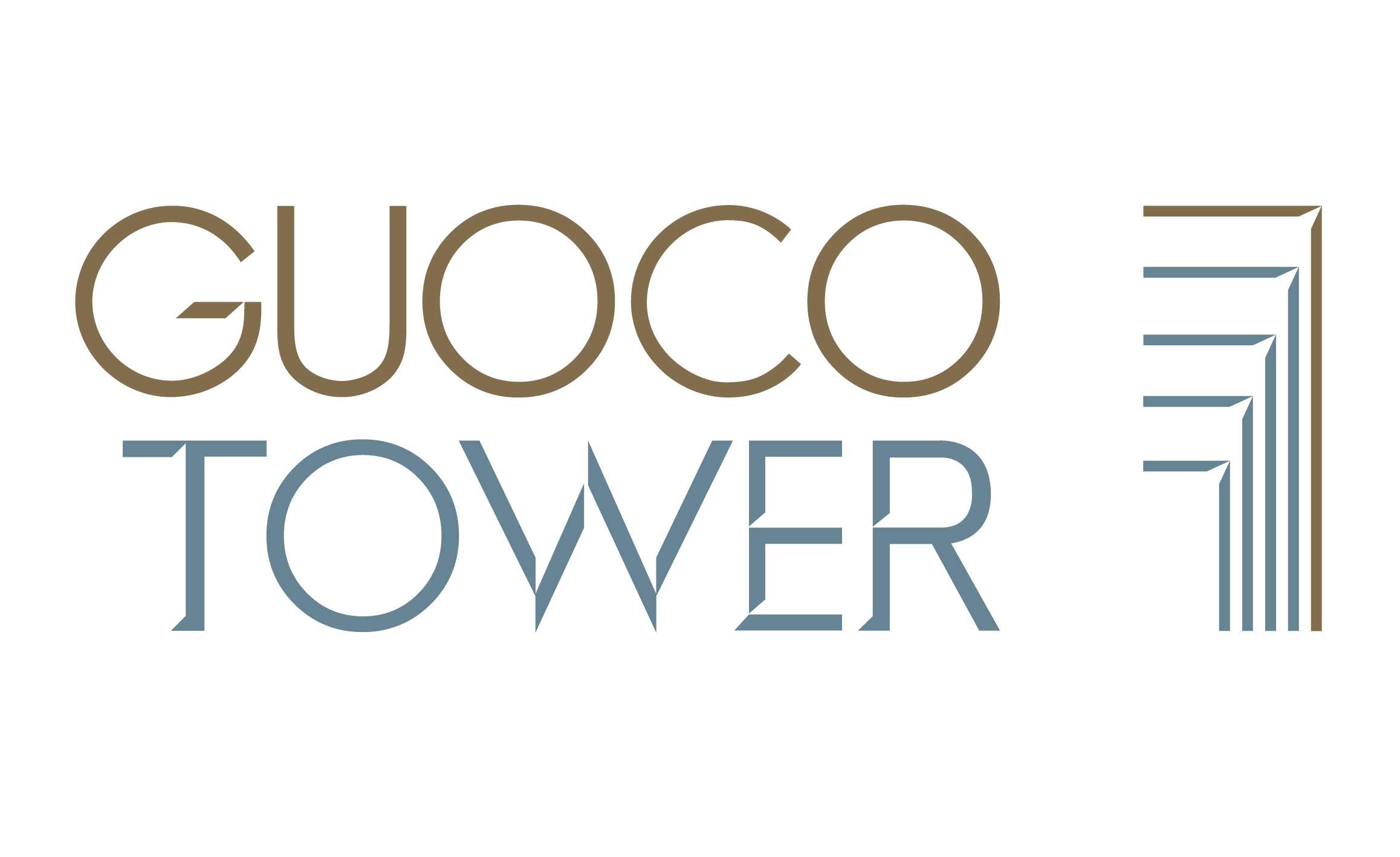

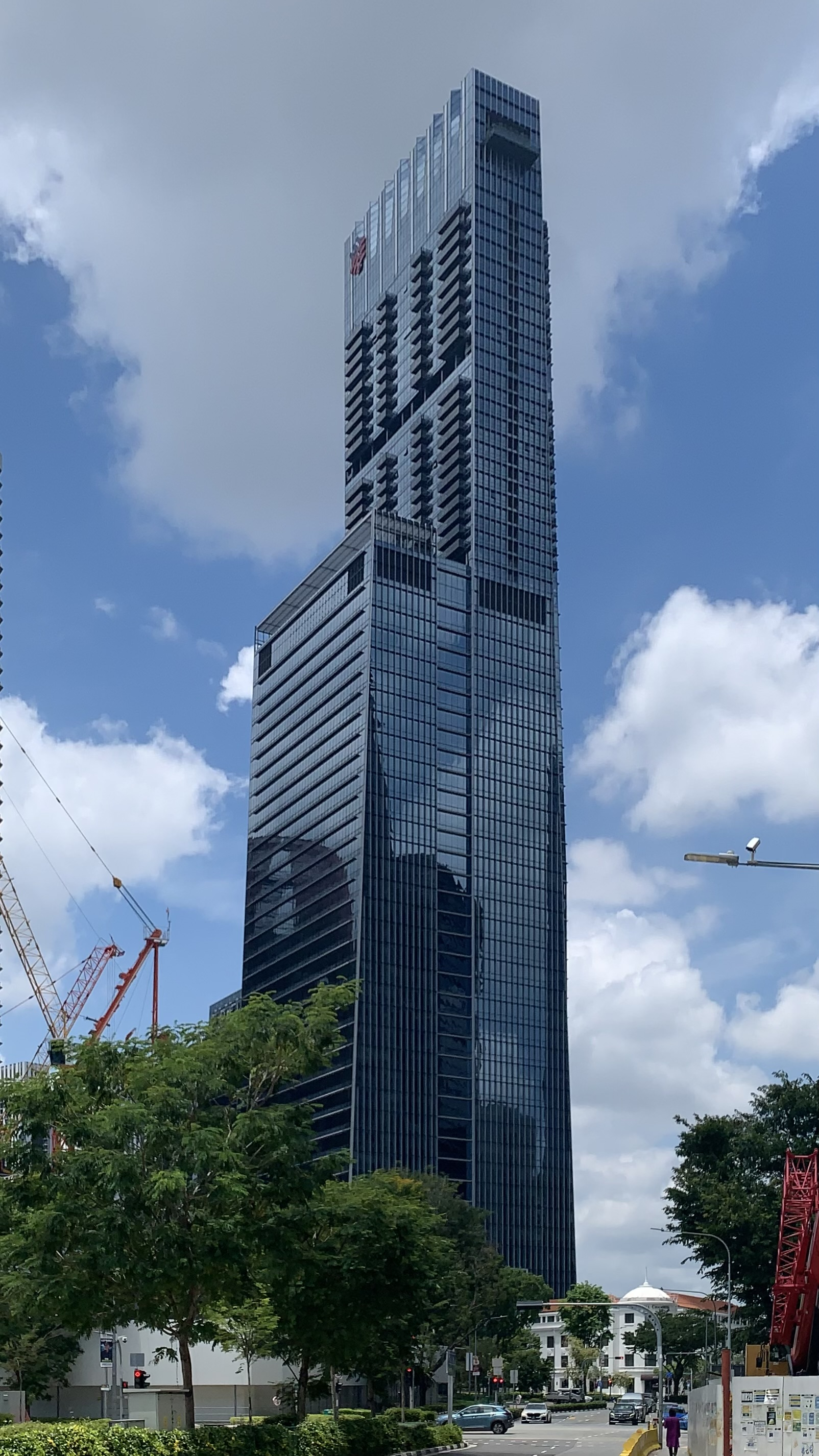
- Guoco Tower in 2025
- Former names: Tanjong Pagar Centre

Record height
- Tallest in Singapore since 2016^{[I]}
- Preceded by: One Raffles Place; UOB Plaza; Republic Plaza

General information
- Status: Completed
- Type: Office; Residential; Hotel
- Architectural style: Contemporary modern
- Location: Tanjong Pagar, Central Business District, Singapore, 1 Wallich Street, Singapore 078881
- Coordinates: 1°16′37.560″N 103°50′45.960″E
- Construction started: 2013
- Completed: 2016

Height
- Height: 290 m (950 ft)

Technical details
- Floor count: 65
- Floor area: 158,000 m^{2} (1,700,000 sq ft)
- Lifts/elevators: 45

Design and construction
- Architect: Architects 61; Skidmore, Owings & Merrill
- Developer: GuocoLand Limited
- Structural engineer: Arup Group
- Main contractor: Samsung C&T Corporation

Website
- guocotower.com

Guoco Tower is a mixed-use development skyscraper in Tanjong Pagar of the Downtown Core district of Singapore. With a height of 290 m (950 ft), it is currently the tallest building in Singapore, breaking the record held jointly by UOB Plaza, One Raffles Place and Republic Plaza for more than 20 years.

== Background ==
Formerly known as the Tanjong Pagar Centre, the 65-storey, 1.7 million sq ft skyscraper was developed by GuocoLand and designed by Skidmore, Owings & Merrill. It is the headquarters of Guocoland Limited (Singapore) and is the only skyscraper exempted from the height restriction of 280m. Guoco Tower houses the rooftop Urban Park, the Wallich Residence apartment complex, and Sofitel Singapore City Centre. The tower also has a mall, which includes a variety of food options like City Hotpot and Ah Lock & Co. and Aburi-EN.

The development won the 2014 World Architecture News Mixed-Use Award in the Future Projects category, and was shortlisted for the 2015 World Architecture Festival Commercial Mixed-Use Award in the Future Projects category.

== Notable residents ==
In July 2019, British industrialist and designer James Dyson purchased a 21,108 square foot (1,961.0 m^{2}) triplex penthouse apartment at the top of the building for £43 million (US$52.8 million). He later sold the flat in October 2020 for £36 million to Chinese American businessman Leo Koguan.

== See also ==
- List of tallest buildings in Singapore
- Architecture of Singapore

Records
Preceded by UOB Plaza; One Raffles Place; Republic Plaza	Tallest building in Singapore; 283.7 m (931 ft); 2016–	Succeeded by Current
