= Boat Quay =

Coordinates: 1°17′12.65″N 103°50′58.24″E

- Subzone of Singapore River Planning Area

Name transcription(s)
  - Chinese: 驳船码头
  - Pinyin: Bóchuán Mǎtóu
  - Malay: Boat Quay
  - Tamil: போட் கீ
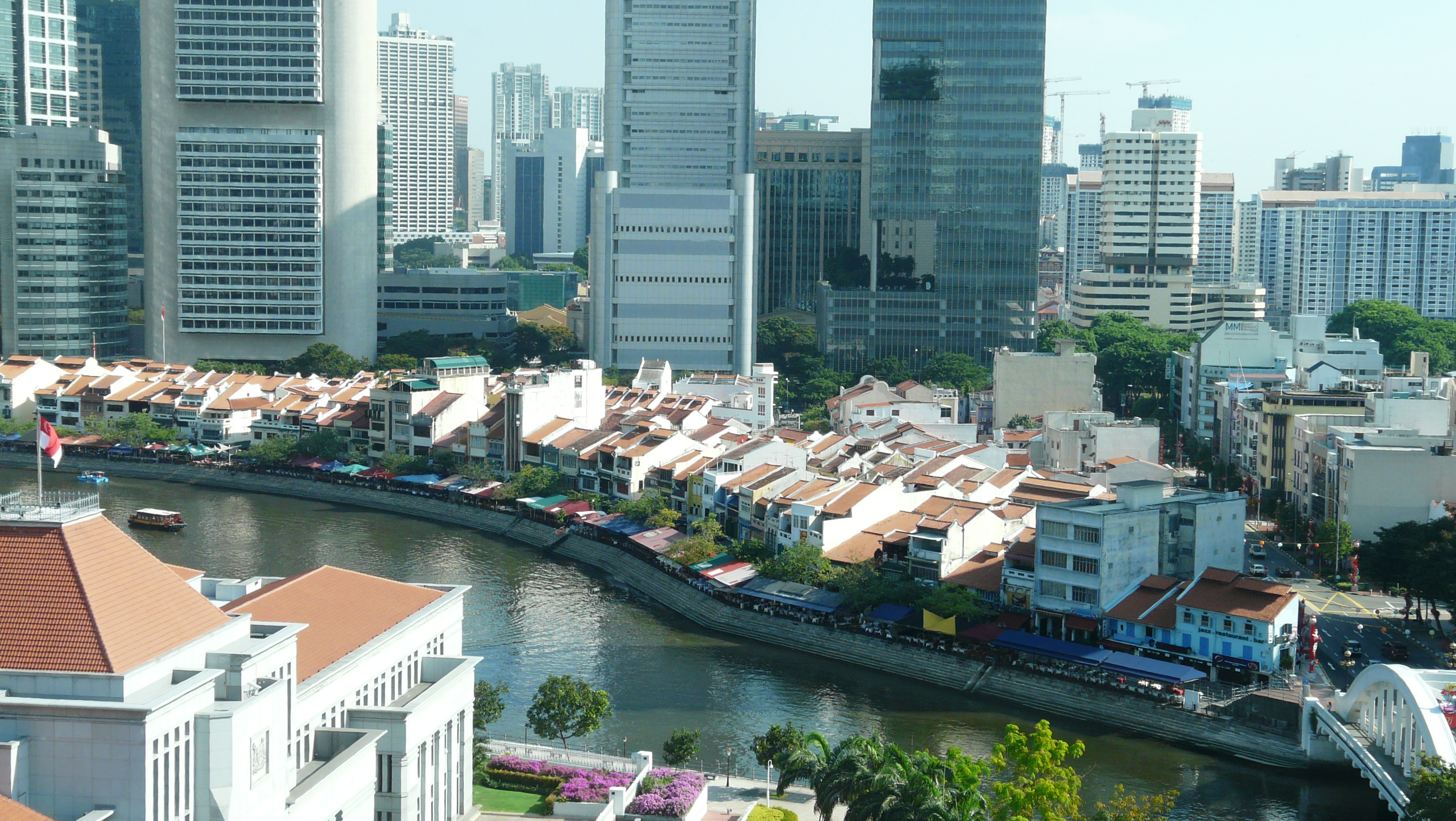
- Aerial view of the quay
- Interactive map of Boat Quay
- Country: Singapore

Boat Quay is a historical quay in Singapore which is situated upstream from the mouth of the Singapore River on its southern bank. It spans from the shophouses near UOB Plaza, stretching along one bank of the Singapore River, as far as Elgin Bridge.

It was the busiest part of the old Port of Singapore. Many shophouses were built, crowded into the area, because the south of the river here resembles the belly of a carp, which according to Chinese belief is where wealth and prosperity lay. Though serving aquatic trade is no longer Boat Quay's primary role, the shophouses have been carefully conserved and now house various bars, pubs and restaurants. Therefore, Boat Quay's social-economic role in the city has shifted away from that of trade and maritime commerce, and now leans towards more of a role accommodated for tourism and aesthetics for the commercial zone of which encloses the Singapore River. It is the soft front to the cosmopolitan banking and financial sectors lying immediately behind it.

Boat Quay is also the name of the road along the quay, which has since been converted into a pedestrian mall.

== History ==
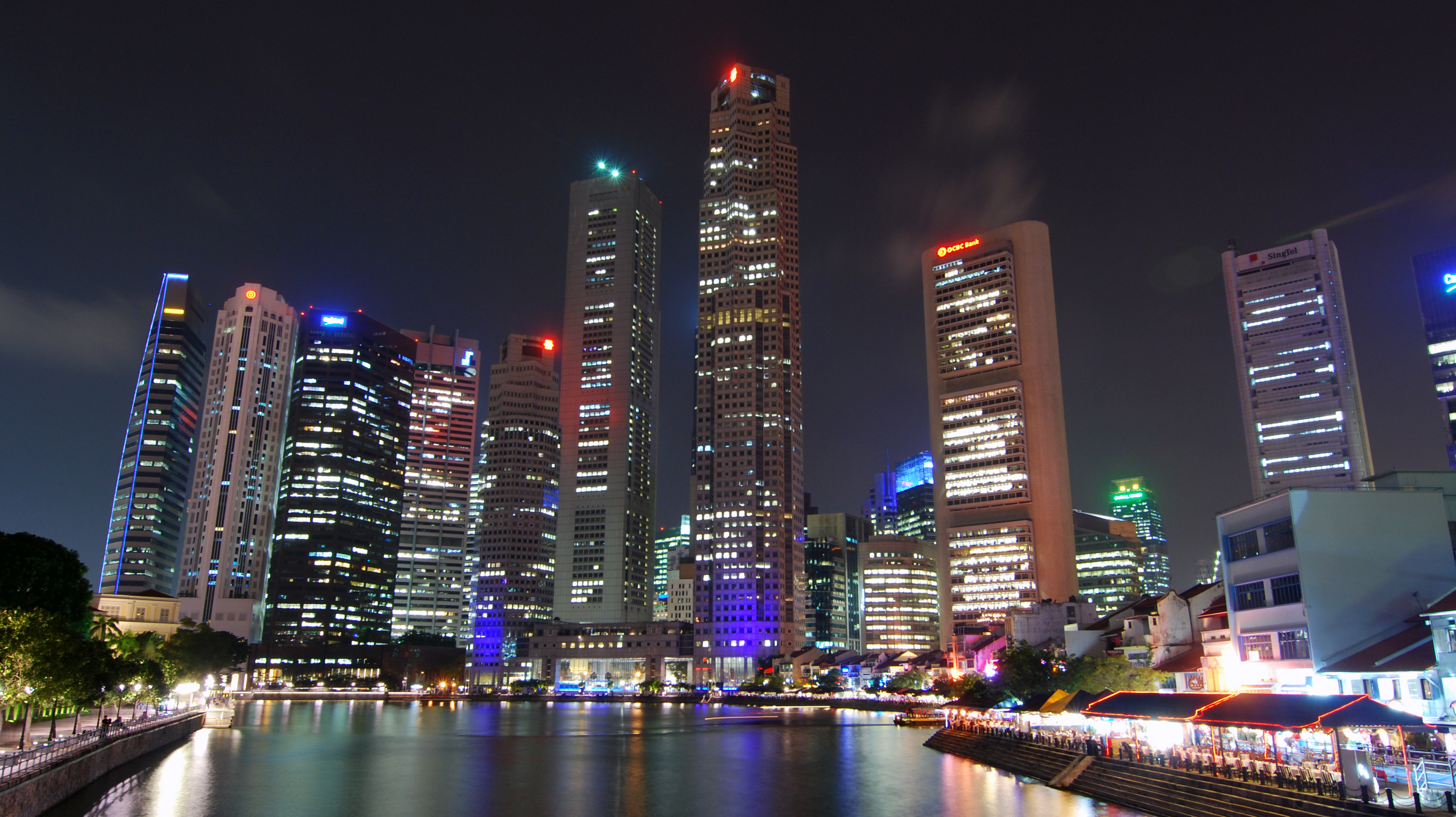
The quay and the Singapore skyline at night

During the 1800s, Boat Quay was used to transfer various goods onto cargo ships, such as porcelain, rubber and spices. Trading in Boat Quay reached a peak in the mid-1800s, handling three-quarters of all shipping business during the 1860s.

== Conservation ==
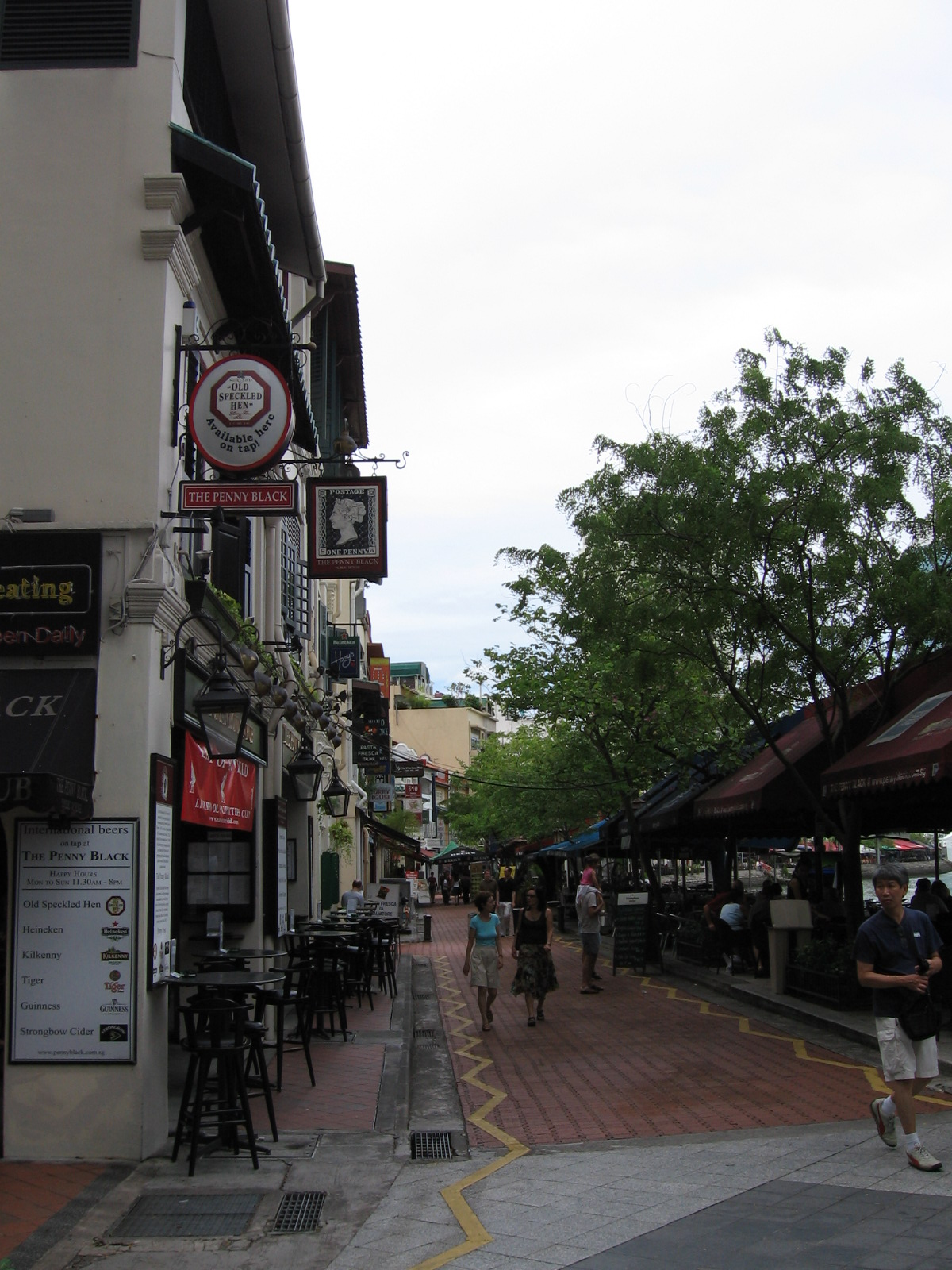
Since the 1990s, Boat Quay has been transformed into a pedestrian mall with restaurants, pubs, cafes and clubs.

The Singapore government cleaned-up the river in 1983 and moved the remaining shipping industry's lighters to a new quay near Pasir Panjang. Boat Quay became deserted and was unused from 1983 to 1989.

In 1986, the Urban Redevelopment Authority announced plans to preserve Boat Quay as part of a master plan for conserving the whole of the Singapore River and its environs.

On 7 July 1989, an area encompassing South Bridge Road, Circular Road, Lorong Telok and North Canal Road was gazetted. The two- and three-storey shophouses in that area, with their characteristic five-foot way beneath projecting upper floors, were preserved and transformed into new businesses. The shophouses and godowns along the river bank were restored in the 1990s and are now bustling shops, restaurants and bars.

When the area became a conservation area in 1989, redevelopment began and by 1993 all historic shophouses were under reconstruction. The Singapore Urban Redevelopment Authority issued stringent guidelines for the restoration but did not provide cash grants or tax relief for conservation projects, although they waived some of the development charges, car parking requirements and car park deficiency charges.

The historic shophouses could now easily be re-used for modern businesses, such as restaurants, cafes, bars and small shops. The interior of the buildings could be modified with the new use in mind, in some cases using new non-traditional interior ornamentation, materials, and colours. For instance, the interior of the Opera Cafe at No. 40 Boat Quay was modified to create an ambiance similar to an opera stage-set. The ground floor of the Lim Family Shophouse at No. 58 Boat Quay was converted into a Japanese restaurant. The upper floor is used as a weekend flat for the Lim family, who lived in the building since 1908. The architect Mok Wei Wei created more open space by demolishing some of the original partition walls, but kept and restored the original teak floors, paint colour on the window frames, wooden balcony doors, and tile roofs. The historic blackwood furniture and art pieces were also restored and re-used. Boat Quay now forms a prominent part of Singapore's nighttime economy, with new nightlife uses having been approved for many properties and licensing hours extended on all Thursday and Friday nights to 4am the next day.

Multiple startup companies also rent offices around the Boat Quay and nearby Circular Road area.

== Gallery ==
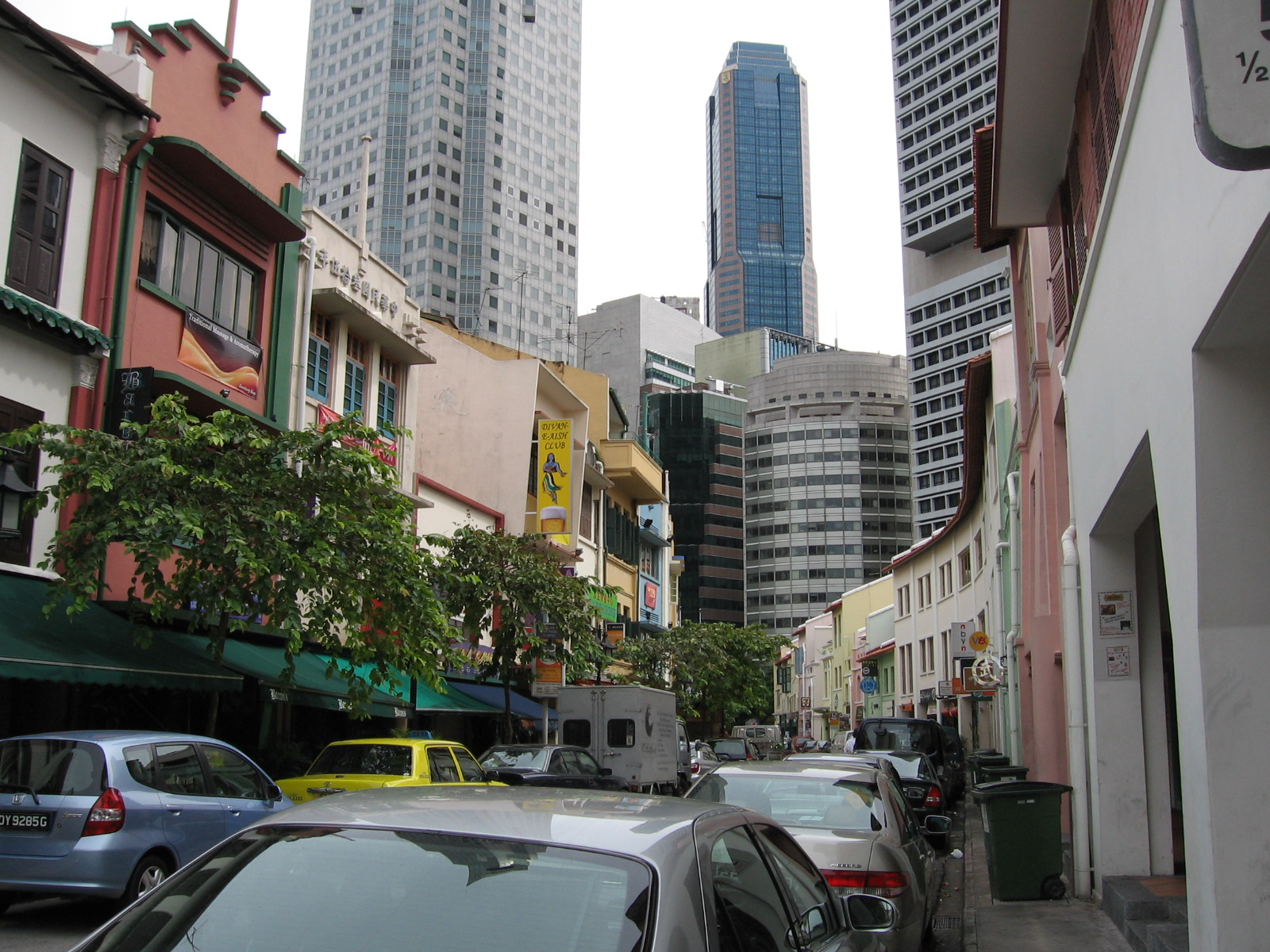
Conserved shophouses line both sides of Circular Road at Boat Quay

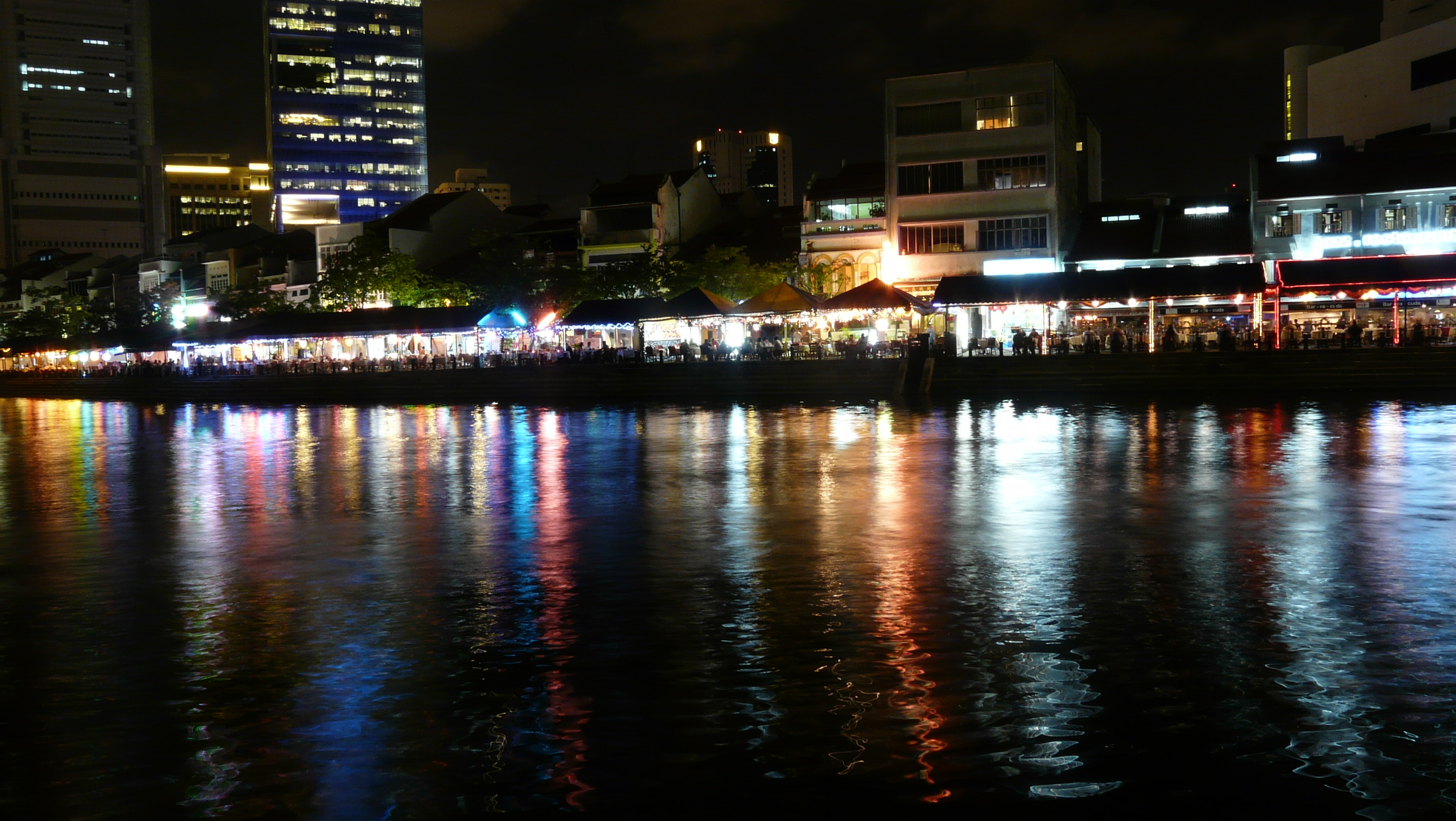
Night view of the restaurants and pubs that line the Singapore River

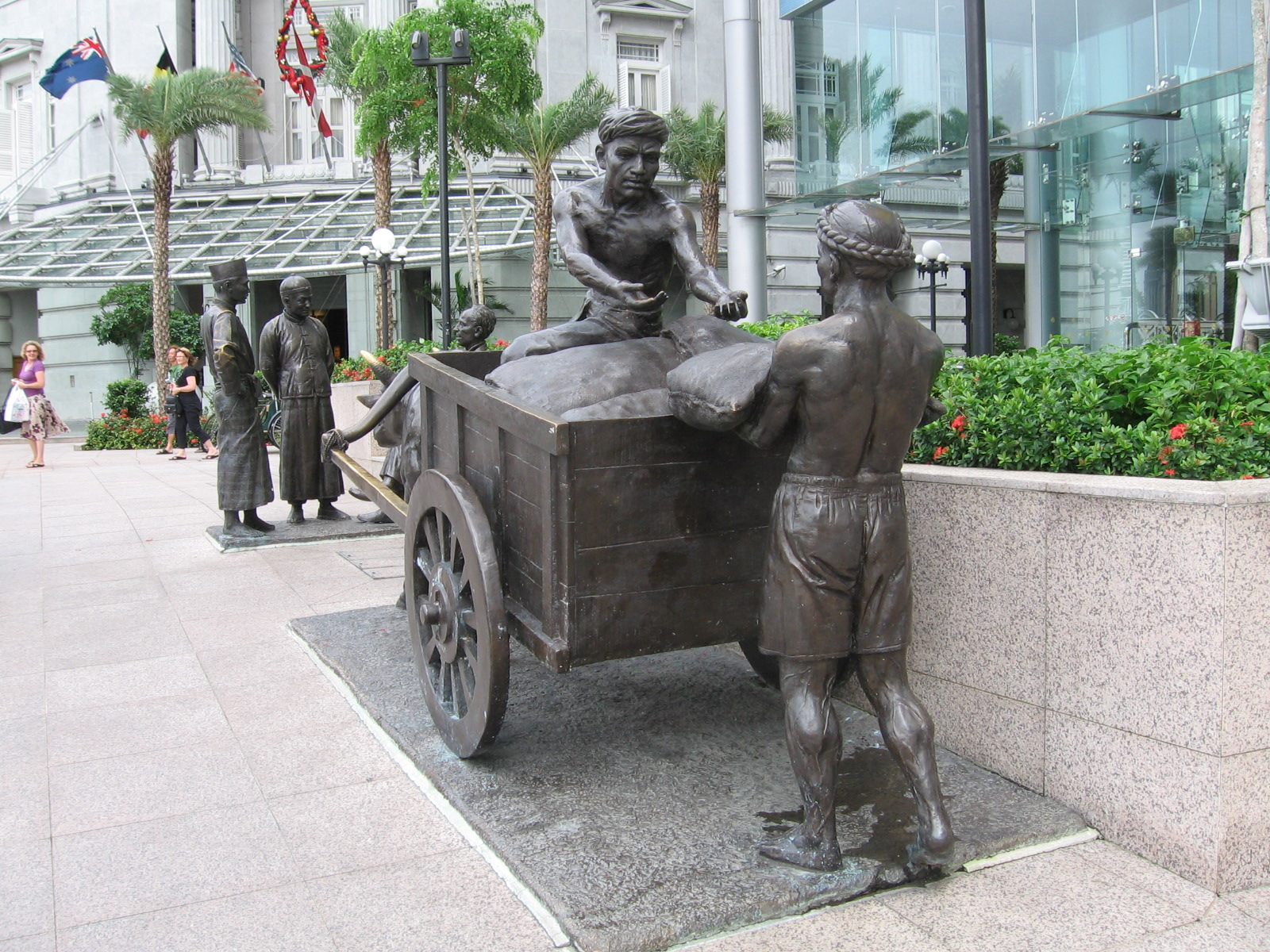
Sculptures at Boat Quay depict activities carried out on the banks of Singapore River in the 19th century and early 20th century

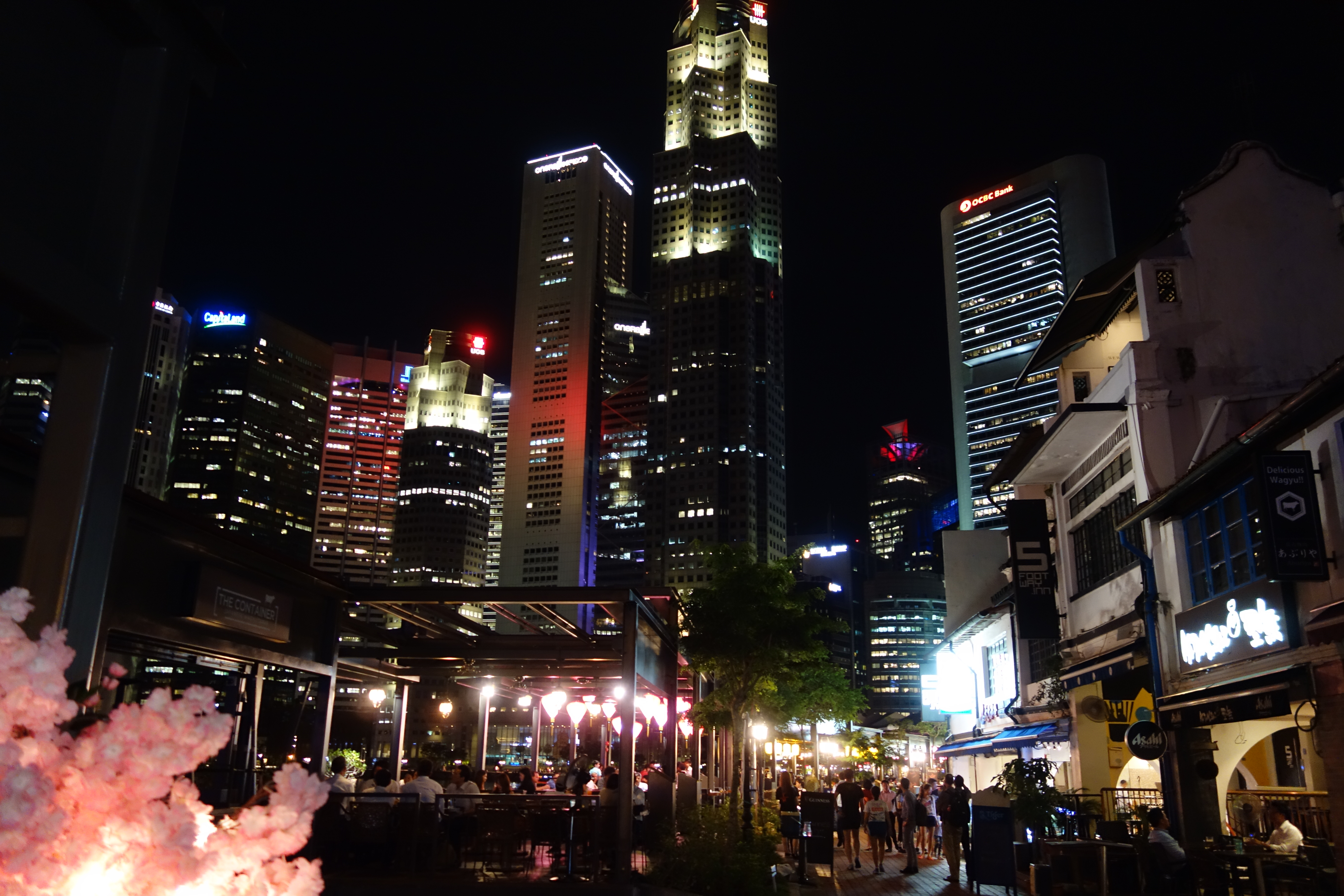
Night view of Boat Quay

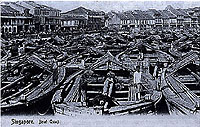
Boat Quay during its heyday around 1865, when as many as 150 boats moored on the river, trading everything from rubber, tin and iron, to silk, porcelain, rice, opium, spices and coffee.

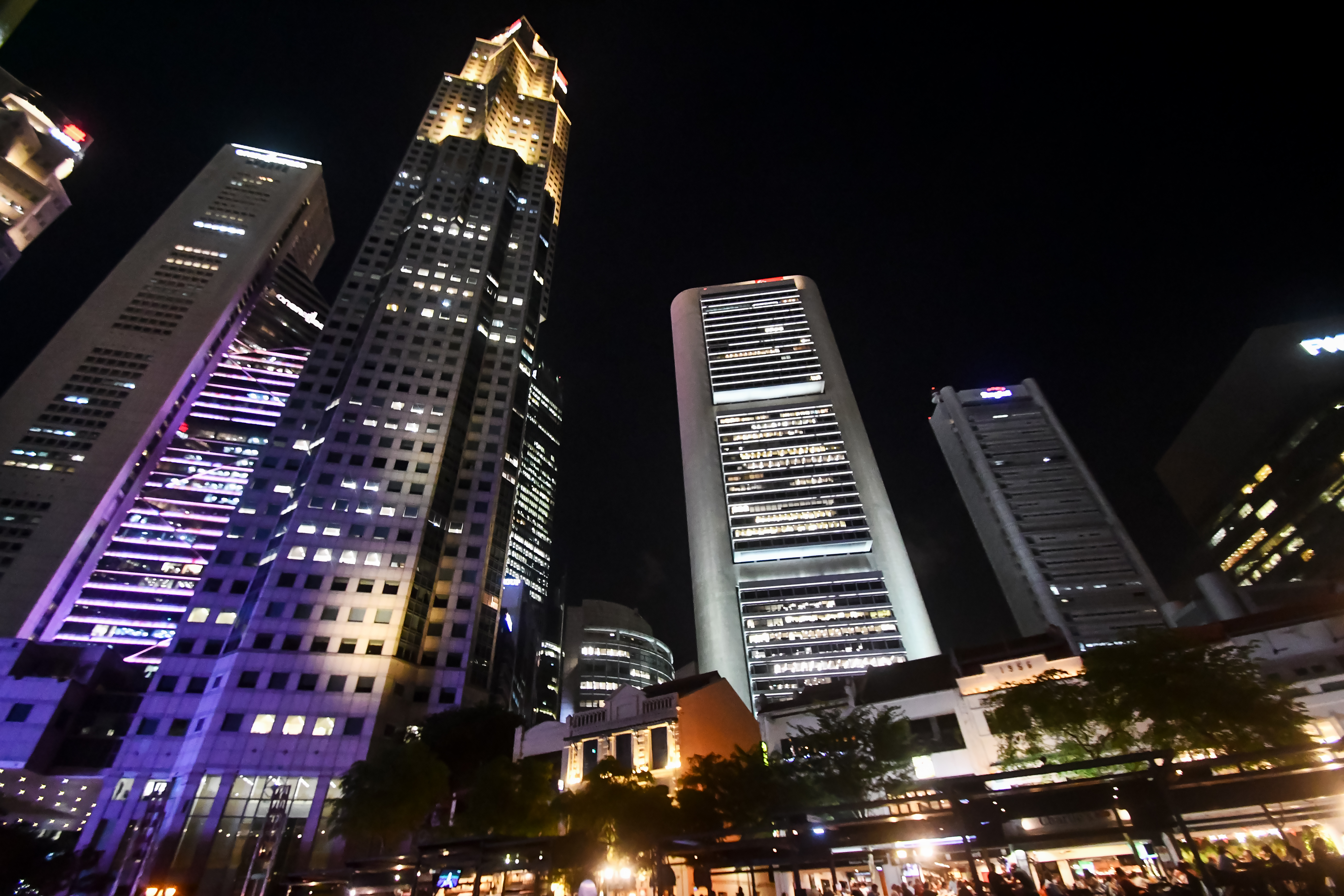
Boat Quay and the skyscrapers of the nearby financial district.

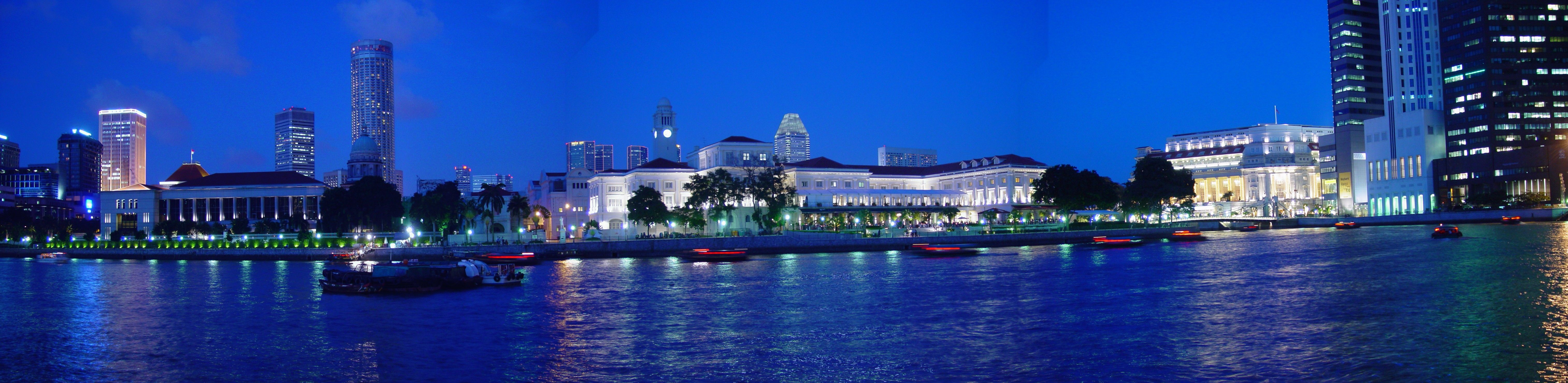
The Parliament House (left) and Empress Place Building (centre) along North Boat Quay Promenade, and The Fullerton Hotel (right) at Boat Quay at night

== See also ==
- Raffles Place
- Singapore River
- List of restaurant districts and streets

== Literature ==
- National Heritage Board (2002), Singapore's 100 Historic Places, Archipelago Press, ISBN 981-4068-23-3
- Victor R Savage, Brenda S A Yeoh (2003), Toponymics – A Study of Singapore Street Names, Eastern Universities Press, ISBN 981-210-205-1
