= One Raffles Place =

Office skyscraper in Singapore

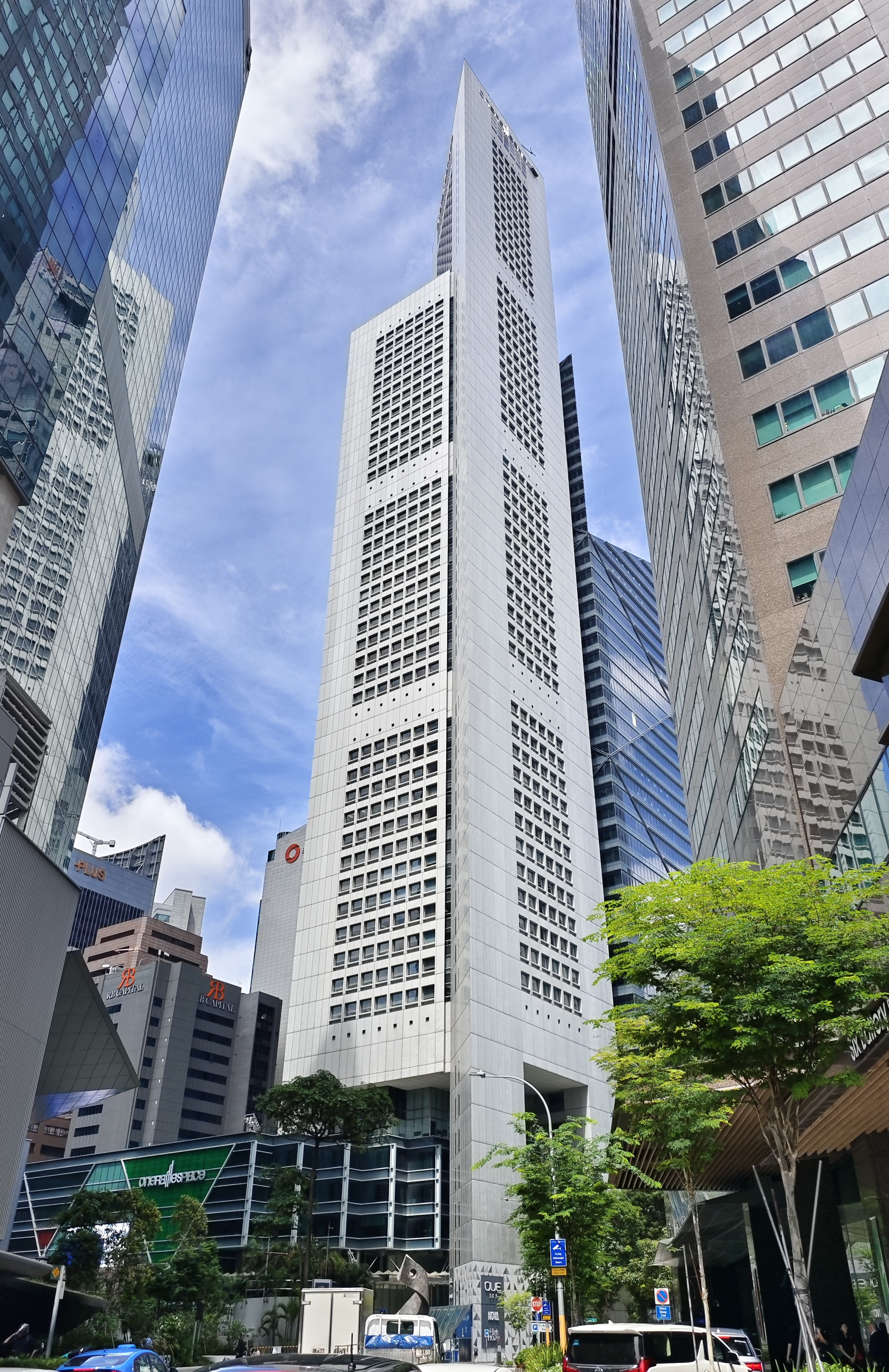
- Interactive map of the One Raffles Place area
- Former names: Overseas Union Bank Centre; OUB Centre

General information
- Type: Commercial offices, Retail
- Location: Raffles Place, Downtown Core, Singapore, 1 Raffles Place, Singapore 048616
- Coordinates: 1°17′03″N 103°51′04″E
- Construction started: 1980
- Completed: Tower 1: 1986; Tower 2: 2012
- Owner: Overseas Union Enterprise
- Operator: OUB Centre Limited

Height
- Roof: Tower 1: 280 m (920 ft); Tower 2: 209 m (686 ft)

Technical details
- Floor count: Tower 1: 63, 4 below ground Tower 2: 38, 1 below ground
- Floor area: 101,784 m^{2} (1,095,590 sq ft)

Design and construction
- Architect: Kenzo Tange Associates
- Developer: OUB Centre Limited
- Structural engineer: Bylander Meinhardt Partnership
- Main contractor: Tower 1: Kajima Corporation Tower 2: Sato Kogyo (S) Pte. Ltd.

Website
- http://www.onerafflesplace.com.sg

One Raffles Place is a skyscraper in Downtown Core, Singapore. The development comprises two towers and a podium. The 280 m (920 ft) tall Tower One and the 38-storey Tower Two house offices, while the podium contains retail space. Initially conceived in the late 1970s as Overseas Union Bank Centre, the headquarters of Overseas Union Bank (OUB), work on the building began in 1981, while construction of the superstructure subsequently commenced in October 1984. Costing S$486 million to build, OUB Centre opened in two phases in June and December 1986, and 90% of its office space was occupied upon opening. At the time of its completion, The Business Times claimed that the complex's tower was the tallest in the world outside the United States.

The building came under the control of the United Overseas Bank (UOB) upon their takeover of OUB in 2001, and was subsequently sold to Lippo Group in 2005 as part of Overseas Union Enterprises (OUE). In June 2008, the building's retail podium was redeveloped to make way for a second office tower, which opened in September 2012, and was rebranded as One Raffles Place. The refurbished podium subsequently reopened in May 2014.

== Design ==
Design work for the OUB Centre was carried out by Kenzo Tange and SAA Architects. As initially built, the OUB Centre comprised a podium block and an office block. The podium block consisted of six levels of retail space and five levels of offices, and had an underground connection to Raffles Place MRT station. Comprising a steel frame, and reinforced concrete shear walls, the 60-storey office block had a height of 280 metres (920 ft), and contained 39,108 square metres (420,960 sq ft) of office space.

The complex's second tower, One Raffles Place Tower Two, was designed by Paul Noritake Tange. The 38-storey tower houses 360,000 square feet (33,000 m^{2}) of offices, and is designed to be environmentally friendly, with fittings such as solar panels and rainwater collection systems. The tower was awarded the Building and Construction Authority Green Mark Platinum certification for its environmentally friendly design.

== History ==
=== Planning ===
Plans for the redevelopment of the Overseas Union Bank's (OUB) headquarters in Raffles Place were first drawn up in the late 1970s. As part of the redevelopment scheme, in October 1979, OUB temporarily shifted its headquarters to a new purpose-built building along Boon Tat Street.

In June 1980, OUB, together with Overseas Union Enterprises, incorporated OUB Centre Ltd to carry out the development of its new headquarters. OUB also purchased the plot once occupied by the Robinsons department store from the Urban Redevelopment Authority (URA) in the same year for the new development.

=== Construction ===
Work on the building commenced in April 1981. The presence of many large boulders in the soil at the site made it necessary for the contractor to use the most technologically advanced excavation equipment, and bored piles were used for the building's foundation to minimise the impact on nearby buildings. In addition, with the site located at the busy Raffles Place, excavated earth could only be cleared at night. Temporary piling work concluded in March 1983, and the building's foundations were completed by October 1983, followed by the development's underground portion in November 1984.

The tender for the construction of the building's superstructure received ten bids, five of which were shortlisted, and it was awarded for S$213 million to a consortium comprising Kajima, Hazama-Gumi, and Japan Development and Construction in April 1984. Besides construction of the superstructure, the same consortium had built the building's foundation, while work on the building's basements was contracted to Ssangyong for S$28 million.

Construction of the main building commenced in October 1984, and was expected to take 14 months to complete. In order to finance the building's construction, OUB Centre Ltd took S$165 million of loans from ten banks in March 1986.

The OUB Centre's podium block and the first 12 floors of the tower were completed by June 1986. OUB moved in on 10 November 1986, while the rest of the tower block was opened in December 1986. By April 1987, 90% of the office space in the building was occupied, mostly by banks and money brokers. 20% of the office space was used as OUB's headquarters, while the Stock Exchange of Singapore (SES) occupied an additional five floors. Nevertheless, the takeup for the building's retail space was not as good, with only 41 of 78 retail units occupied.

Having cost S$486 million to build, the OUB Centre was officially opened by then-Prime Minister of Singapore Mr Lee Kuan Yew on 8 August 1988. At the time of its opening, The Business Times claimed that the tower, which had a height of 280 metres (920 ft), was the tallest one outside the United States.

=== The 1980s, 1990s and 2000s ===
In January 1989, the Singapore International Monetary Exchange (Simex) announced that it would be moving to OUB Centre from the World Trade Centre, and that it would take over SES's trading floor in the building. Simex moved its administrative office into the OUB Centre in July 1989, and it took over the trading floor in September.

Frenchman Alain Robert, well known for climbing skyscrapers, aborted an attempted climb on this building on 3 November 2000. After reaching the 21st floor, the police dissuaded Robert's ascent, and he re-entered the building through a window on the 23rd floor. He was detained by the Singapore police who treated his stunt as criminal trespass.

In 2001, the Singapore Exchange moved most of its operations to Unity Towers, with only the open outcry trading pit remaining in OUB Centre. The trading pits were subsequently closed in 2006 when their lease ran out.

With the takeover of OUB by the United Overseas Bank (UOB) in 2001, ownership of the building was transferred to UOB, as part of Overseas Union Enterprises (OUE). In May 2006, UOB sold the building, along with several other properties, to Lippo Group as part of an effort to divest its non-financial holdings in order to comply with Singapore government regulations.

=== The 2010s and 2020s ===
In June 2008, OUE started redevelopment of OUB Centre's retail podium to make way for a second office tower, and set aside S$530 million for its development. In November 2008, OUE announced that OUB Centre, along with the new tower, would be branded as a single development called One Raffles Place. The new tower was officially opened by then-Deputy Prime Minister Tharman Shanmugaratnam on 18 September 2012.

Besides the second tower, the complex's retail podium underwent a significant renovation, which included the replacement of its facade, and re-opened on 29 May 2014. With six levels, and 98,500 square feet (9,150 m^{2}) of retail space, the podium had a 90% take-up rate at the time of its re-opening.

Nevertheless, by May 2017, One Raffles Place's retail areas were faring poorly, with many of the larger tenants moving out, and other tenants planning to move out after their lease ended. This performance was, according to The Straits Times, attributed to office workers in the Central Business District only shopping there at specific times of day. In spite of this, several food establishments, including a food court, opened at the podium during this period. In addition, OUE Commercial Reit carried out further renovations at the retail podium in 2018, in a bid to improve the shopping experience there.

== See also ==
- List of tallest buildings in Singapore
- List of tallest freestanding steel structures
- List of buildings

Records
Preceded by DBS Building Tower One	Tallest building in Singapore; 280 m (920 ft); 1986–2016	Succeeded by Guoco Tower
