= CPF Building =

Office skyscraper in Singapore

Former CPF Building
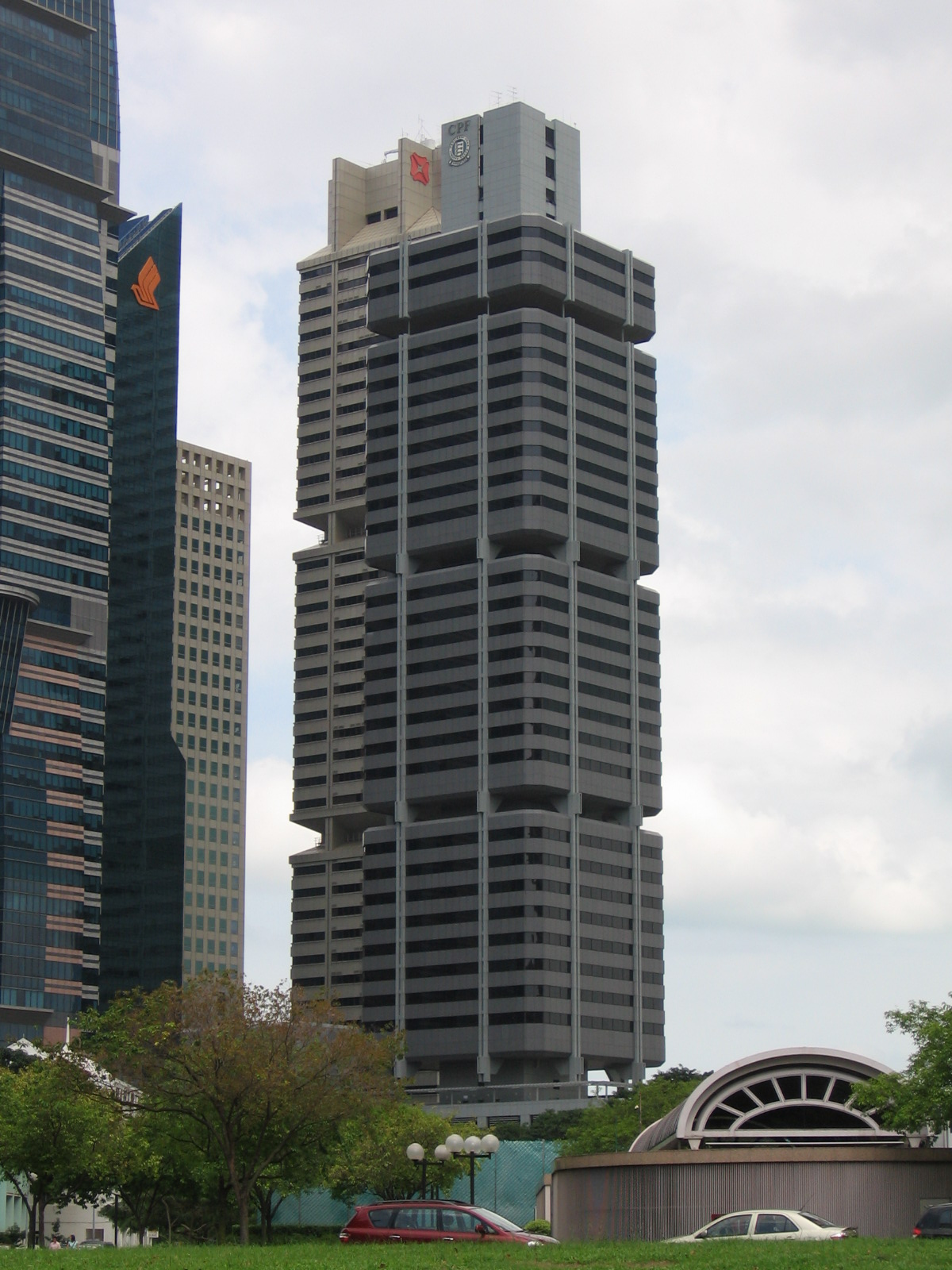
- The former CPF Building (2006)

- Location within Singapore
- Alternative names: Central Provident Fund Building

General information
- Status: Demolished
- Type: Government offices Commercial offices
- Architectural style: Brutalist
- Location: Shenton Way, Downtown Core, Singapore, 79 Robinson Road, Singapore 068897, Downtown Core, Singapore
- Coordinates: 1°16′36.6″N 103°50′52.3″E
- Named for: Central Provident Fund
- Construction started: 1976; 50 years ago
- Demolished: 2017; 9 years ago
- Owner: CapitaLand

Height
- Roof: 171 m (561 ft)

Technical details
- Floor count: 46

Design and construction
- Architecture firm: Public Works Department of Singapore

The former CPF Building was a high-rise skyscraper located in the central business district of Singapore. The tower was located on 79 Robinson Road, in the Shenton Way and Tanjong Pagar zone. The building was near several other skyscrapers such as OUE Downtown, Robinson 77 and Capital Tower, which are all about 100 metres away from the building's former site.

It housed the headquarters of the Central Provident Fund Board (CPF).

== History ==
The CPF Building was designed by the Public Works Department of Singapore. The building was completed by 1976. Other firms involved in the development includes Lalesse Gevelliften BV (KONE Lalesse Gevelliftinstallaties), and the CPF. The building was reclad in 2001.

=== Protests ===
On 12 August 2005, a rare demonstration by four people demanding greater transparency and accountability in Singapore's state-managed pension fund and other government-linked agencies. The two men and two women assembled at lunchtime outside the CPF building in the central business district, Robinson Road, Singapore. They claimed they did not need a permit and staged their protest for about an hour. However, soon a dozen anti-riot police wearing helmets and knee-high protective gear and carrying shields and batons forced them to disperse.

== Architecture ==
The CPF Building exhibited the International architectural style. Similar in design to DBS Building Tower One, the main materials used in its construction were aluminium reinforced concrete, glass and granite. The structural types applied in its development were cantilever, with a concrete core.

== Demolition ==
In November 2015, the building was sold to Ascendas Land (now CapitaLand) for S$550 million. The last tenant moved out on 20 February 2017.

The building was demolished and redeveloped into a 29-storey office tower called CapitaSky (formerly known as 79 Robinson Road), which was initially slated to be completed in 2020.

== See also ==
- List of tallest buildings in Singapore
- List of tallest voluntarily demolished buildings
