= Tanjong Pagar MRT station =

Mass Rapid Transit station in Singapore

Tanjong Pagar EW15 丹戎巴葛 தஞ்சோங் பகார்
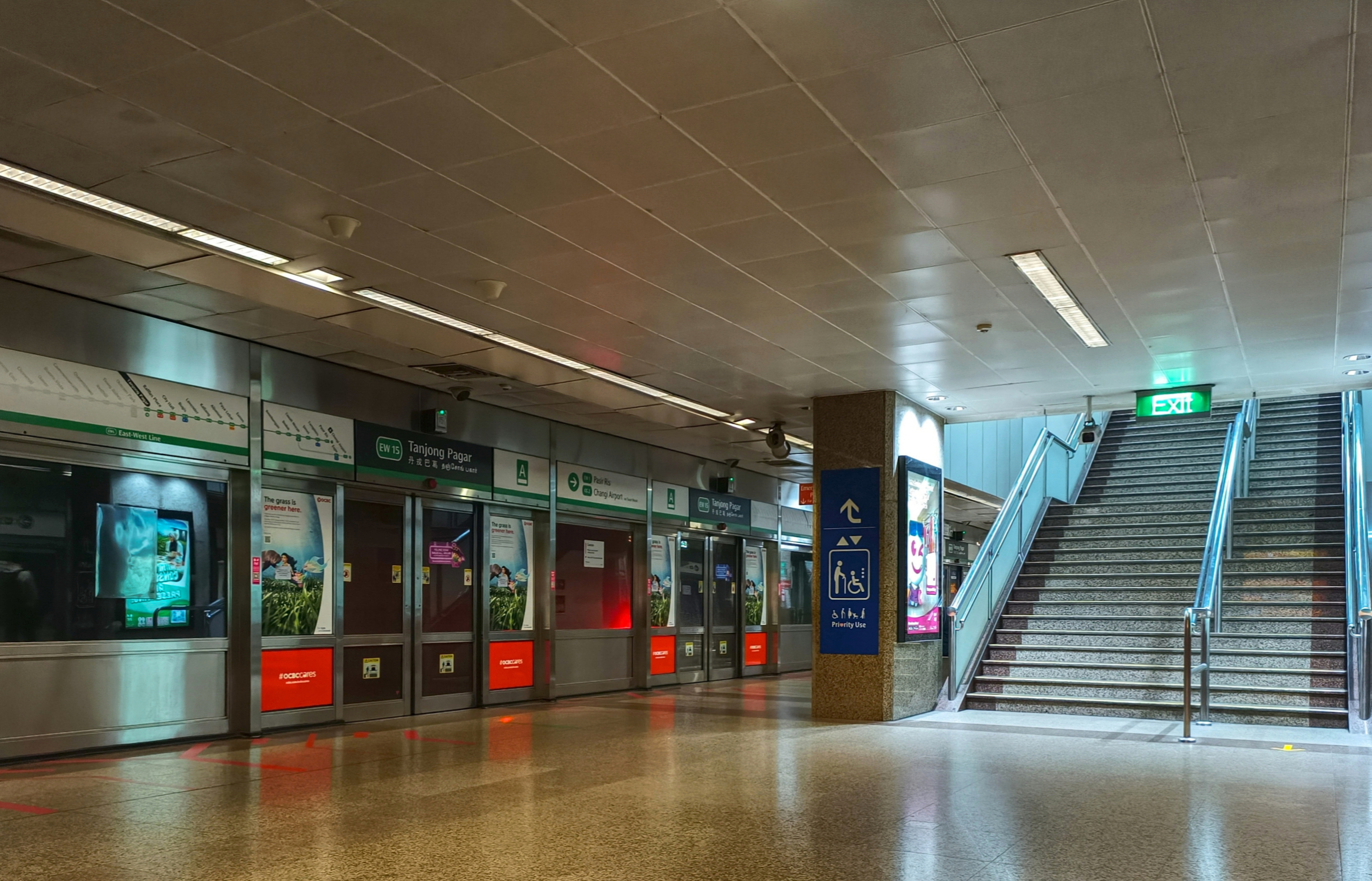
- Platform level of Tanjong Pagar MRT station

General information
- Location: 120 Maxwell Road; Singapore 069119
- Coordinates: 1°16′35.18″N 103°50′44.56″E
- System: Mass Rapid Transit (MRT) station
- Operator: SMRT Trains
- Line: East–West Line
- Platforms: 2 (1 island platform)
- Tracks: 2
- Connections: Taxi

Construction
- Structure type: Underground
- Platform levels: 1
- Parking: Yes (International Plaza, Guoco Tower, Capital Tower)
- Accessible: Yes

History
- Opened: 12 December 1987; 38 years ago
- Former names: Maxwell

Passengers
- June 2024: 32,238 per day

Services
Preceding station	Mass Rapid Transit	Following station
Raffles Place towards Pasir Ris	East–West Line	Outram Park towards Tuas Link
Track layout
Location
- Location within Singapore Rail central area

Tanjong Pagar MRT station is an underground Mass Rapid Transit (MRT) station on the East–West Line located at Maxwell Road between the junctions of Peck Seah Street and Cecil Street in Downtown Core, Singapore. The station was built in the 1980s, and was opened in December 1987. Taking its name from Tanjong Pagar Road, which is located near the station, it is directly underneath and directly connected to Guoco Tower, and is located near Tanjong Pagar Complex and International Plaza.

== History ==
In November 1982, a 12,211.9-square-metre (131,448 sq ft) plot of land between Wallich Street and Chong Guan Street was gazetted for acquisition by the government for the construction of the station, which was then named Maxwell. In December 1983, Contract 108 for the construction of Maxwell station, along with the tunnels between it and Raffles Place station, was awarded to Taisei-Shimizu-Marubeni, a Japanese consortium, for S$63.4 million. The station site was shifted 15 metres (49 ft) closer to Wallich Street in 1984 to eliminate a sharp bend on the line.

During construction of the tunnels under Robinson Road between this station and Raffles Place, grouting was utilised to minimise the impact of tunnel construction on nearby buildings' structural stability, by increasing the stability of the ground around the bored tunnels. In November 1986, in a bid by the MRTC to give the system a local touch, the station's name was changed from Maxwell to Tanjong Pagar. The station opened on 12 December 1987, as part of the extension of the system to Outram Park.

Upgrades to the station to facilitate disabled access were completed by June 2006, and a retail area linked to the station, named Tanjong Pagar Xchange, was opened by the end of 2008. In 2013, the station was fitted with flood barriers, being one of the first six stations in the system to receive such barriers.

== Station details ==
=== Etymology ===
The station takes its name from Tanjong Pagar Road, which in Malay means "cape of stakes", a name that reflects its origins as a fishing village situated on a former promontory.

=== Location and services ===
The station is located under Guoco Tower, adjacent to Choon Guan Street, and is near Tanjong Pagar Complex, URA Centre, Maxwell Chambers, the AXA Tower, International Plaza and Robinson 77. It serves the East–West Line between Raffles Place and Outram Park and has the station code EW15.

=== Public art ===
Tradewind by Anthony Poon, a 560 kg (1,230 lb) stainless steel artwork, is suspended from the station's ceiling. The installation consists of triangular plates, meant to portray ship sails, with red lines, which the artist views as a reflection of Singapore's "bustling international trade". The triangular plates are arranged so that they seem to form a diamond, which looks similar to boxes of cargo being hoisted. In addition, Tanjong Pagar station also features two wall murals by Aw Tee Hong and Iskandar Jalil. It was installed as part of the MRTC's S$2 million (US$3 million in 2022) commission of artworks at six MRT stations along the NSL.

Additionally, there is a 67-metre (220 ft) long mural by Ng Peng Sing entitled Singapore on Canvas. Partnering with the Tanjong Pagar Community Club and Tanjong Pagar-Tiong Bahru Grassroots Organisations, the hand-drawn mural depicts Singapore's history in the last 200 years and serves as a reflection on the development of Singapore. The mural is claimed to be the "longest hand-drawn historical art mural in [Singapore]".
