= Hong Leong Building =

Office skyscraper in Singapore

Hong Leong Finance Building
- 丰隆大厦
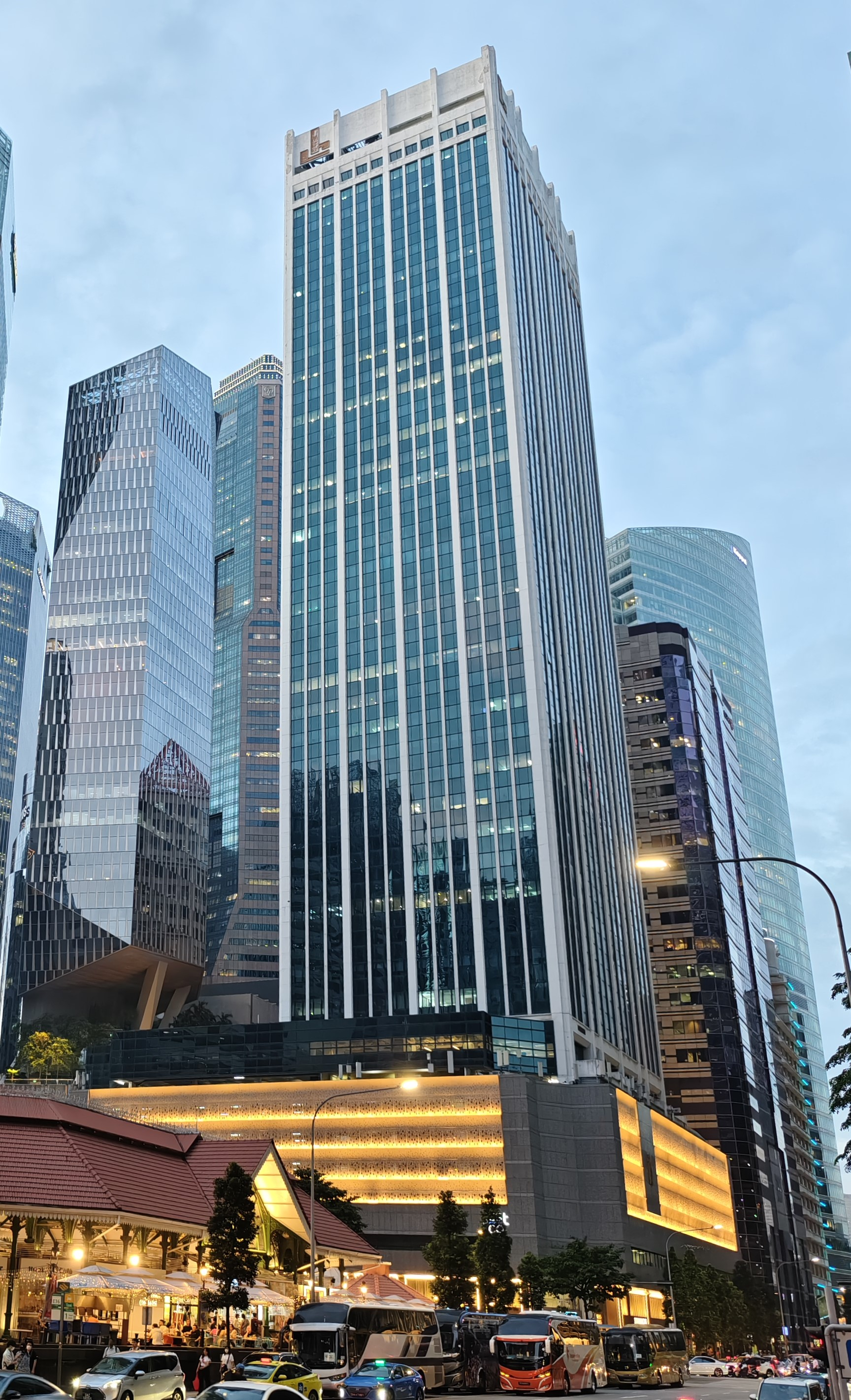
- Hong Leong Building at dusk in September 2025

General information
- Status: Completed
- Type: Commercial offices
- Architectural style: Modernism
- Location: 16 Raffles Quay, Singapore 048581
- Coordinates: 1.281308°N 103.850939°E
- Completed: 1976; 50 years ago

Height
- Roof: 158 m (518 ft)

Technical details
- Floor count: 45

Design and construction
- Architects: Swan and Maclaren

Hong Leong Finance Building (Chinese: 丰隆大厦) is a high-rise office skyscraper in the central business district of Singapore. This is the flagship building of Hong Leong Holdings Limited. It is located on 16 Raffles Quay, in the zone of Raffles Place.

It is just next to the historic Lau Pa Sat Market. There are many skyscrapers near the building, such as One Raffles Quay, 6 Raffles Quay, Robinson Towers, John Hancock Tower, and AIA Tower, all of which are less than 100 metres away. With 45 floors of office space (parking levels from 4 to 7) and one basement level consisting of shops and a cafeteria, the building stretches 158.0 metres above ground.

Hong Leong Finance Building currently houses the Embassy of Panama on the 41st floor and the Embassy of Norway on the 44th floor.

== History ==
Hong Leong Building was designed by Swan and Maclaren, and was completed in 1976. Other firms involved in the development include Ssangyong Engineering & Construction Private Limited, and Knight Frank.

== Tourist attractions ==
- Asian Civilization Museum is - 0.6km
- Boat Quay is - 0.6km

=== Tremors ===
In March 2007, about 5000 workers were evacuated from the building, after they felt some tremors. They were caused by two earthquakes in Sumatra, Indonesia. Some people complained of headaches and dizziness while others vomited. Most of these complaints originated from those working at the higher floors of the building. Several businesses operating at the building were disrupted after the evacuation.

== Tenants ==
Office tenants include Hong Leong Group Singapore Holding, Tokyo Stock Exchange Singapore Branch, Hawksford, ahrefs, etc. Ground floor tenants include Maybank, Starbucks and Watsons.

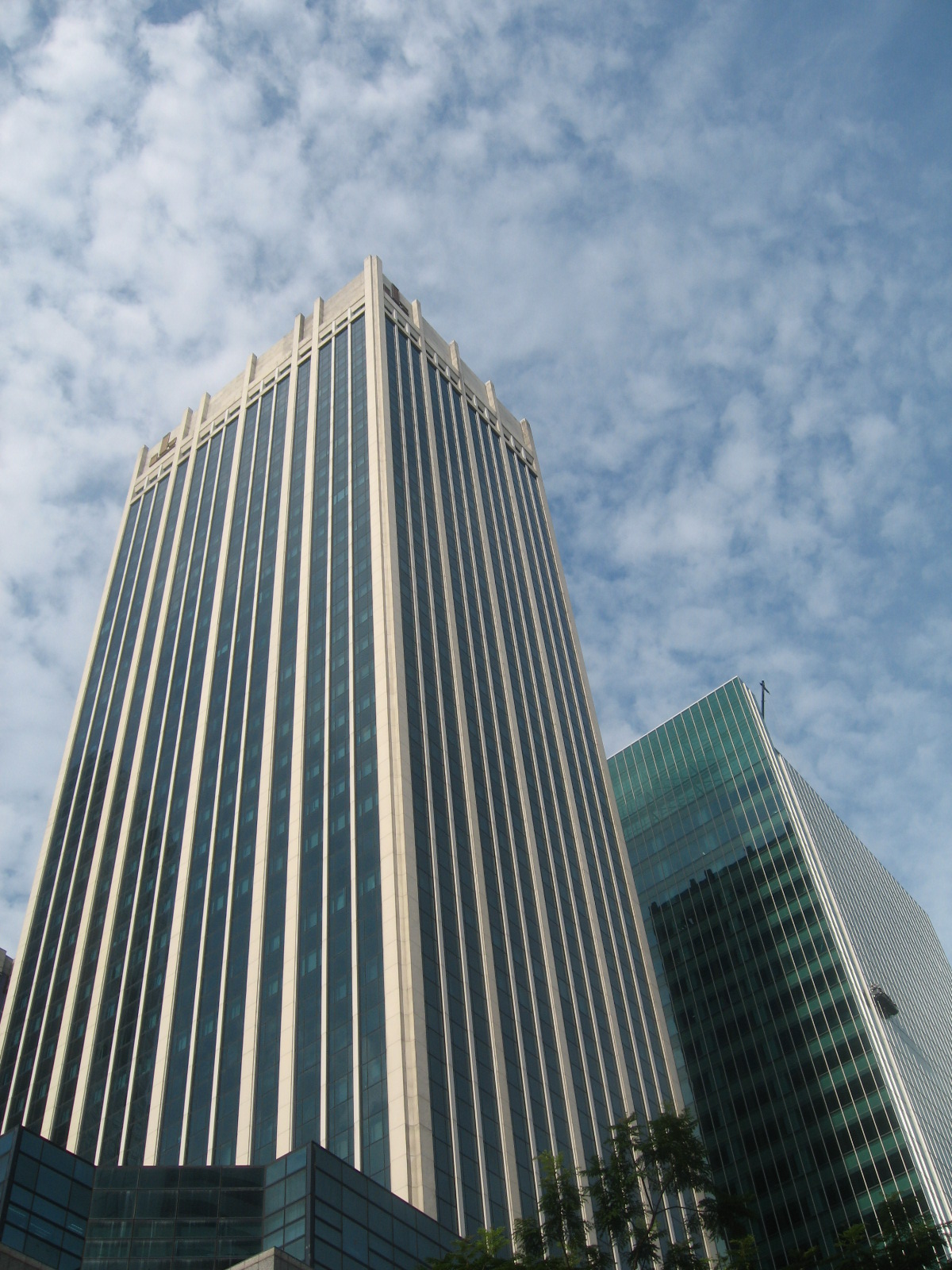
Hong Leong Finance Building

== See also ==
- List of tallest buildings in Singapore
- CapitaLand
- Shenton Way
- Tanjong Pagar
