= Samsung Hub (building) =

Office skyscraper in Singapore

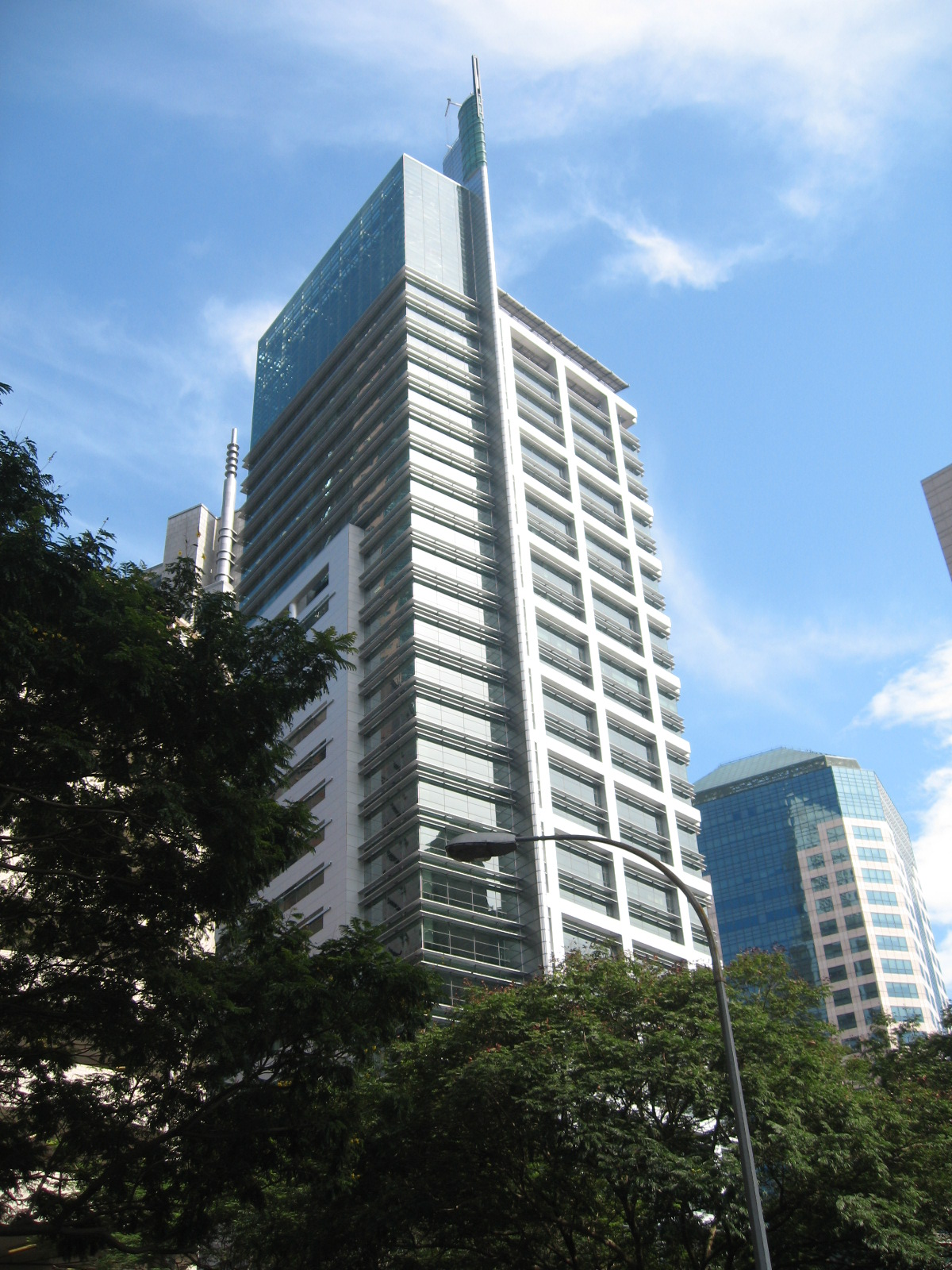
- Interactive map of the Samsung Hub area
- Alternative names: 3 Church Street

General information
- Status: Completed
- Type: Commercial offices
- Architectural style: Modernism
- Location: 3 Church Street, Singapore 049480
- Coordinates: 1.283207°N 103.849752°E
- Construction started: 2000; 26 years ago
- Completed: 2005; 21 years ago
- Owner: Samsung

Height
- Antenna spire: 172 m (564 ft)
- Roof: 130 m (430 ft)

Technical details
- Floor count: 30

The Samsung Hub, formerly 3 Church Street, is a skyscraper located in the central business district of Singapore. Located at 3 Church Street, it is situated just next to the Prudential Tower. It is a 30-storey office building development, which includes a 6-storey podium block on a 35,000 m^{2} (380,000 sq ft) plot of land. The development is a freehold Grade A office tower.

== History ==
Samsung Hub was completed in 2005. Firms involved in the development included Chinese Chamber Realty Private Limited, Church Street Properties Private Limited, China Square Holdings Private Limited, CapitaLand Limited, and Samsung Corporation. It was formerly owned by CapitaLand, but the company soon sold the development to Ho Bee Group.

The space in Samsung Hub is owned by the Singapore Chinese Chamber of Commerce and Industry, its subsidiary, the Chinese Chamber Realty, and OCBC Bank.

In 2007, CapitaLand announced that it was selling its stake in Samsung Hub to the Ho Bee Group for over $140 million. This works out to almost $1,400 per square foot, based on the net lettable area of about 105,000 sq ft (9,800 m^{2}) involved in the transaction. The space owned by CapitaLand comprises the lowest stack of office floors in the building - from the eighth to 15th floors (the first to seventh floors are used for car parking).

== Architecture ==
AWP Pte Ltd were the Architects of the building. Due to its recent completion in 2005, the building exhibits a post-modern style of architecture, and is built mainly of glass and steel.

Usage of quality building materials, such as the heat-strengthened, double-glazed and turquoise-tinted glass was applied during its construction. The light, elegant structure and luminous curtain wall system creates a modern distinct and deliberate contrast with its monolithic neighbours of glass and granite.

The average size per floor plate of the building is about 12,500 sq ft (1,160 m^{2}) and it has a total lettable area of 290,000 sq ft (27,000 m^{2}).

== Tilting incident ==
In August 2002, a tilt on the building was detected by Samsung Corporation. The building sank 3 mm to 39 mm to one side between August and November 2002.

After discovering the tilt, Samsung immediately initiated rectification efforts. Micropiles were injected to redistribute the weight of the building and to correct the tilt. Owners of neighbouring buildings reassured tenants that their buildings were structurally sound, free from such problems, having been certified by the authorities as fit for occupation.

It took a total of 2 years for the rectification work to be completed. Losses due to the construction delay were ameliorated by an agreement between the companies involved, ceding Samsung a portion of the space in the 30-storey tower. Samsung also made "improvements" to the building's facade.

== See also ==
- List of tallest buildings in Singapore
- Raffles Place
