= Lippo Centre =

Lippo Centre may refer to:

- Lippo Centre (Hong Kong), formerly named Bond Centre
- Lippo Centre (Singapore), a skyscraper
