= Fuji Xerox Towers =

Office skyscraper in Singapore

- Chinese: 富士施乐大厦; Malay: Menara Fuji Xerox
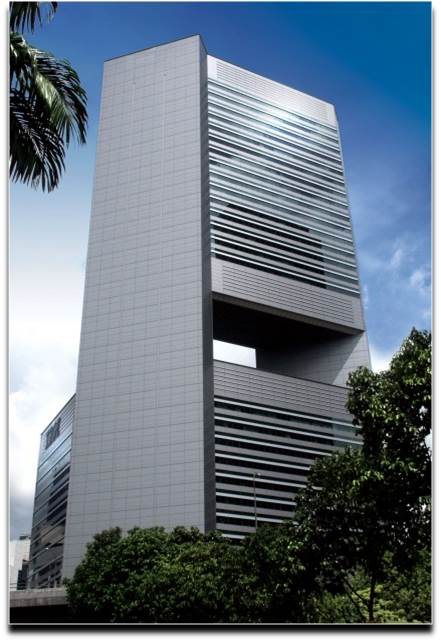
- Interactive map of the Fuji Xerox Towers area
- Former names: IBM Towers

General information
- Status: Demolished
- Type: Commercial offices
- Architectural style: Modernism
- Location: 80 Anson Road, Singapore 079907
- Coordinates: 1°16′24″N 103°50′38″E
- Completed: 1987; 39 years ago
- Demolished: 2023; 3 years ago
- Owner: Fuji Xerox
- Operator: City Developments Limited

Height
- Height: 165 metres (541 ft)

Technical details
- Floor count: 38

Design and construction
- Architect: Alfred Wong Partnership
- Developer: City Developments Limited

Fuji Xerox Towers (formerly IBM Towers) was a high-rise skyscraper located in Downtown Core, Singapore. It was located on 80 Anson Road, in the zone of Shenton Way and Tanjong Pagar. The building sat within four roads, namely Tanjong Pagar Road, Bernam Street, Keppel Road and Anson Road.

The building was next to the Ayer Rajah Expressway, and close to the Lippo Centre, RCL Centre, Realty Centre, and Anson House, all of which are roughly 100 metres (330 ft) away. The 38-storey high freehold development rises 165 metres (541 ft) above ground.

In December 2005, the Fuji Xerox Towers was conferred the Energy Smart Label Award from the Energy Sustainability Unit of the National University of Singapore and Singapore's National Environment Agency.

== History ==
Fuji Xerox Towers was developed by City Developments Limited, and was completed in 1987. Other firms involved in the development include Mitsubishi Elevator and Escalator and IBM Singapore.

=== Naming ===
Fuji Xerox Towers was previously called IBM Towers, as IBM Singapore had been the anchor tenant since the building's opening until 2004. In mid-August 2004, Fuji Xerox leased 93,000 sq ft (8,600 m^{2}) of office space, spread over 7 levels. It made Fuji Xerox the main anchor tenant with about a quarter of leasable space, thereby earning it naming rights. While Fuji Xerox moved into the towers, IBM moved in stages to Changi Business Park over recent years.

=== Fuji Xerox Singapore ===
In 1965, Fuji Xerox Singapore was still part of the Rank Xerox organisation, a joint venture between Rank and Xerox Organisation. The Singapore branch was first incorporated as Rank Xerox (Overseas) Pte Ltd and later renamed as Rank Xerox (Singapore) Pte Ltd in 1985. In 1991, Rank Xerox Singapore was sold to Fuji Xerox Company Ltd of Japan and was renamed Fuji Xerox Singapore.

== Redevelopment ==
In July 2020, CDL announced that Fuji Xerox Towers will be demolished and redeveloped into a 51-storey mixed-use integrated development on its site, comprising residential apartments, serviced apartments and commercial areas. Demolition commenced in 2H 2021. The development is now called Newport Towers and Newport Residences.

On 15 June 2023, part of Fuji Xerox Towers collapsed during demolition works, killing a worker trapped inside.

== See also ==
- List of tallest buildings in Singapore
