= Anson, Singapore =

Coordinates: 1.273°N 103.844°E

Anson
- Subzone of Downtown Core Planning Area

Other transcription(s)
- Interactive map of Anson
- Country: Singapore
- Region: Central Region
- Planning Area: Downtown Core

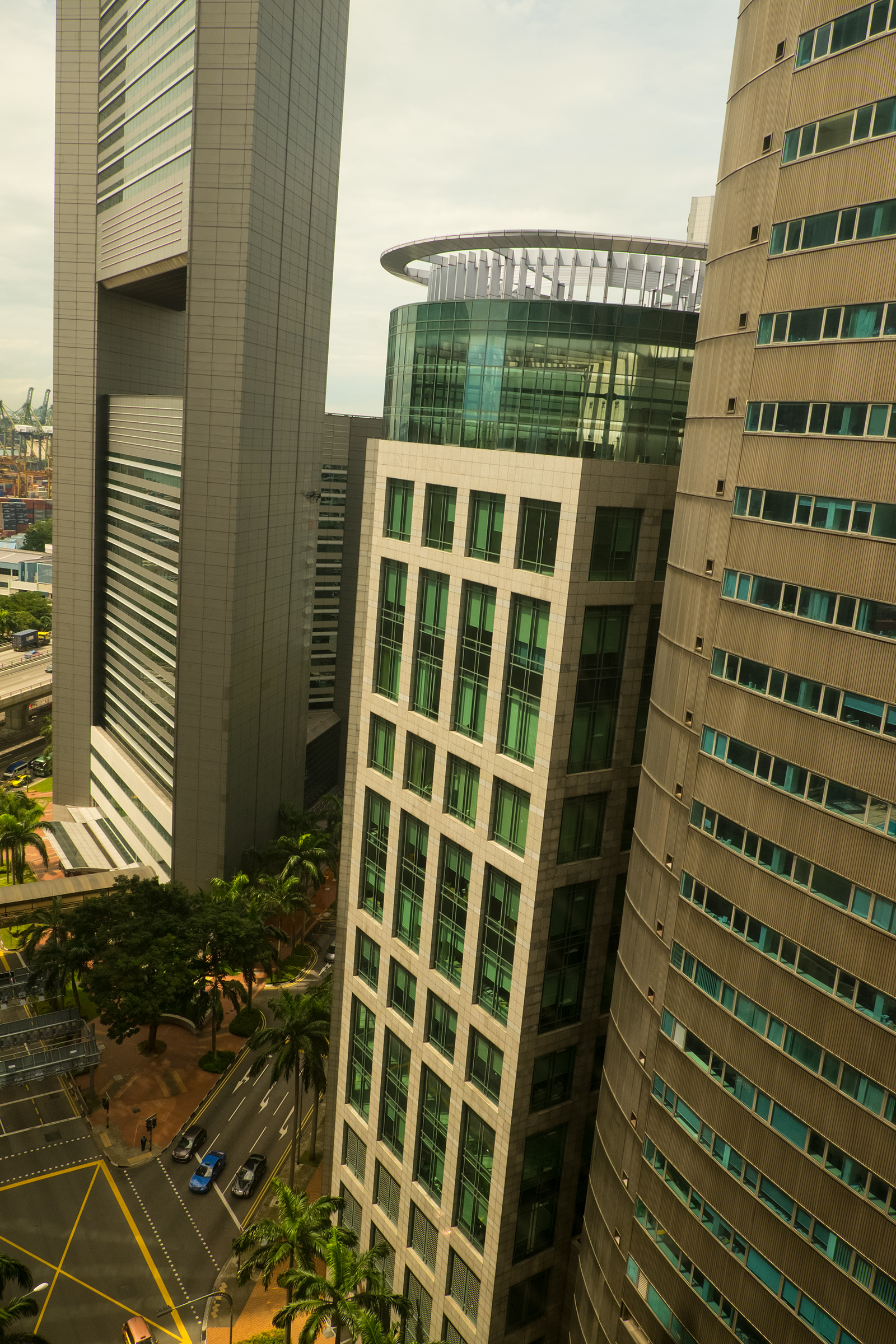
Anson Road, Singapore

Anson is a subzone located within the Downtown Core district of Singapore. Its namesake road, Anson Road, was built in 1879 and is named after Major-General Sir Archibald Anson, a former Lieutenant-Governor of Penang, and probably also after Commodore George Anson, Naval Commander of Far East Squadron in 1815.

Buildings in Anson include the Anson Centre (built in 1971), Anson House, Hub Synergy Point, Springleaf Tower, the International Plaza, MapleTree Anson, M Hotel Singapore, Fuji Xerox Towers and AXA Tower.

== Sources ==
- Thulaja, Naidu Ratnala (26 May 2003). "Anson Road". Singapore Infopedia, National Library Board, Singapore.
