= Springleaf Tower =

Mixed-use skyscraper in Singapore

Coordinates: 1°16′30″N 103°50′47″E

- 春叶大厦
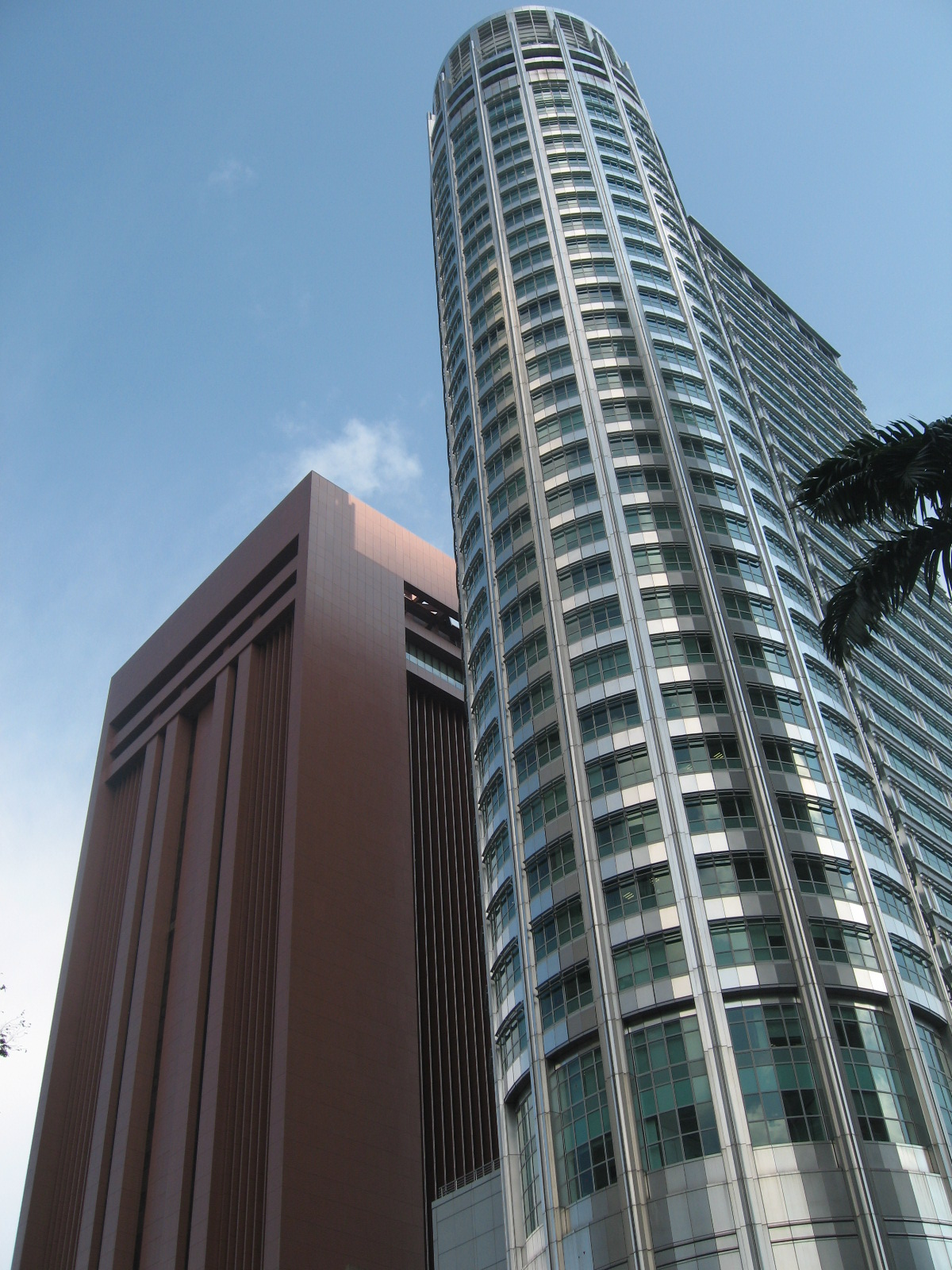
- Springleaf Tower, with MAS Building on the left
- Interactive map of the Springleaf Tower area

General information
- Location: 3 Anson Road; Singapore 079909
- Completed: 2002; 24 years ago
- Owner: Macquarie Global Property Fund II

Height
- Roof: 165 m (541 ft)

Technical details
- Floor count: 37
- Lifts/elevators: 13

Springleaf Tower (Chinese: 春叶大厦) is a 37-storey, 165 m (541 ft) office and residential skyscraper located in the central business district of Singapore located on 3 Anson Road and near Prince Edward Road, The development is in the zone of Shenton Way and Tanjong Pagar near other skyscrapers, such as 8 Shenton Way, MAS Building, International Plaza, and Anson Centre, all of which are roughly 100 metres away. It is a Grade A office building.

== History ==
Springleaf Tower was completed in 2002. Firms involved in the development include CapitaLand Commercial Limited, CapitaLand Limited, Benson Global, and DTZ Debenham Tie Leung (South East Asia) Private Limited.

However, the Springleaf Tower's construction was not smooth. In the late 1990s, the developer of the building, a subsidiary of the now defunct Ban Hin Leong Group, ran into financial problems. It was unable to pay its contractors for the completion of the 37-storey building. This led to the UOB Case.

=== UOB Case ===
The Ban Hin Leong Group suggested that one of the contractors, Yongnam Holdings, purchase a floor, and that it set off the value of its work against the sale price of the floor. It was agreed to by United Overseas Bank (UOB), who was the mortgagee.

However, after Yongnam completed the work, UOB refused to release its mortgage. UOB said that it did not encourage or endorse the barter arrangement and later foreclosed on the building. Yongnam then sued UOB to protect its interest. UOB subsequently lost the case, and was asked to cede ownership of the floor to Yongnam.

=== Building sale ===
Twelve floors in Springleaf Tower were sold in January 2007 for S$134 million, bought by Macquarie Global Property Advisors. Just a few months later, in October 2007, the same twelve floors were sold again, at $225 million. This equates an increase of almost 70 percent. It was bought by SEB Asset Management, part of SEB Group.

=== Cabinet fire ===
On 31 January 2008, there was a fire at Han's restaurant and the tenants at Springleaf Tower were all asked to evacuate their offices. The Singapore Civil Defence Force sent two fire engines, two fire bikes, three support vehicles, one ambulance and one red Rhino to the scene. In total, about 300 occupants of the building were evacuated. It was soon found that a cabinet in the restaurant started the fire.

== See also ==
- List of tallest buildings in Singapore
- CapitaLand
- Shenton Way
- Tanjong Pagar
