= Capital Tower (Singapore) =

Office skyscraper in Singapore

- Chinese: 资金大厦; Tamil: கப்பிட்டல் கோபுரம்
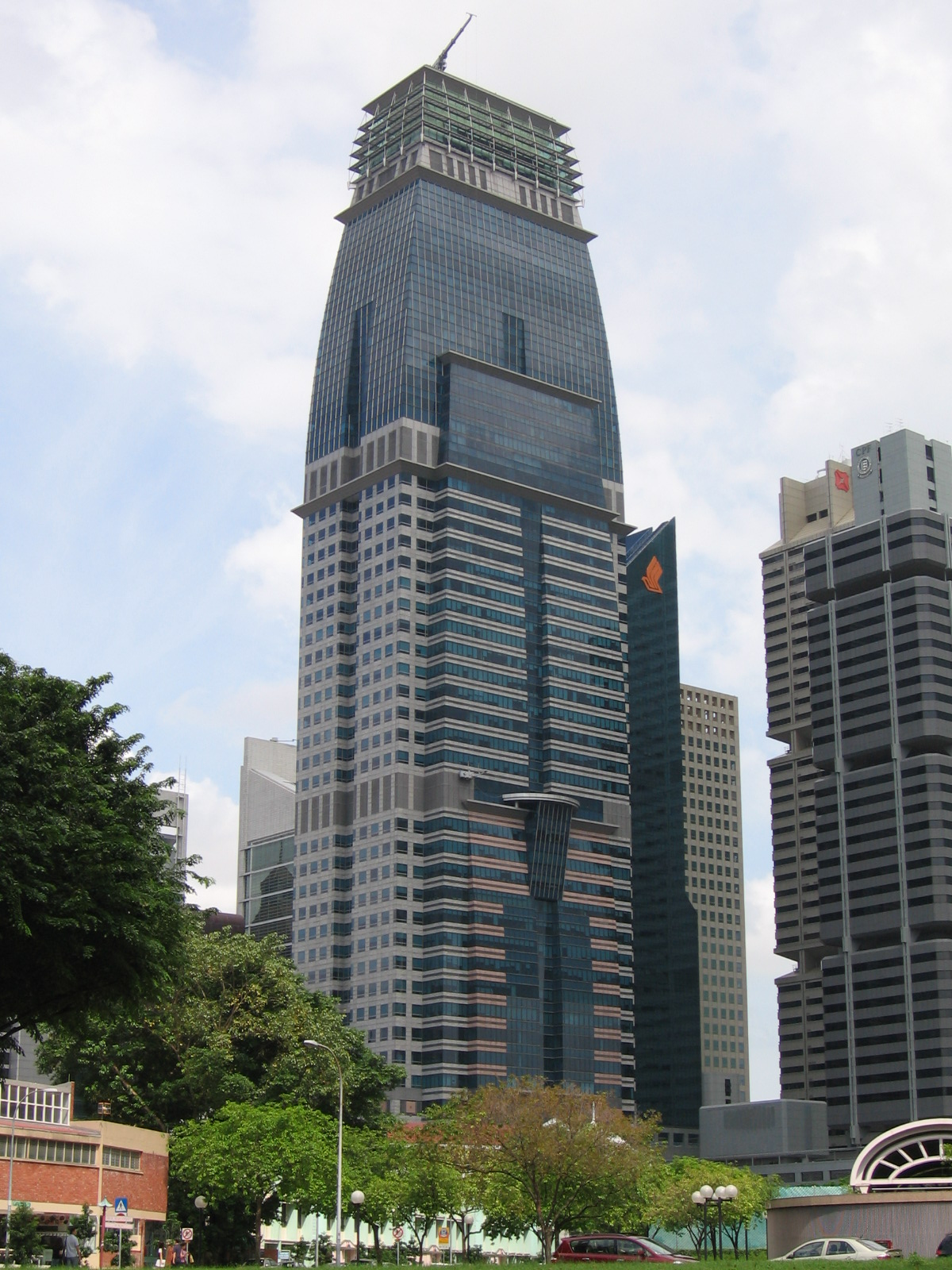
- Capital Tower in January 2006
- Former names: PosBank Headquarters Building

General information
- Type: Commercial offices
- Location: 168 Robinson Road, Singapore 068912
- Coordinates: 1.2775°N 103.8475°E
- Completed: September 2000; 26 years ago
- Opened: 16 May 2001; 25 years ago
- Owner: CapitaCommercial Trust
- Operator: CapitaLand

Height
- Roof: 254 m (833 ft)

Technical details
- Floor count: 52
- Floor area: 95,500 m^{2} (1,028,000 sq ft)
- Lifts/elevators: 20 passenger 2 service

Design and construction
- Architect: RSP Architects Planners & Engineers
- Developer: CapitaLand
- Structural engineer: Maunsell Group
- Main contractor: Ssangyong Group

Website
- capitalandcommercial.com

Capital Tower is a 52-storey, 254 m (833 ft) skyscraper completed in 2000 in the Shenton Way-Tanjong Pagar financial district of Singapore, located at Robinson Road next to Tanjong Pagar MRT station. It is the fourth tallest skyscraper in the city. Formerly planned as the POSBank's headquarters, ownership of the building was transferred to CapitaLand, and became the company's flagship building and was then named after the company. The building was officially opened on 16 May 2001 by Minister for National Development Mah Bow Tan.

Capital Tower has 52 floors, served by five shuttle double-deck lifts. The lifts can load 3,540 kg and travel at a speed of 10 m/s. The building stands out visually at night as the logo and some parts of the building would change its lights once in every few seconds.

== Tenants ==
The 52nd floor the tower was occupied by the China Club. The club opened on 19 May 2001 and closed its doors on 1 June 2020. The club featured a bar, restaurant with private dining rooms and meeting rooms. Only club members had access.

Sushisamba opened their Singapore location on 18 July 2024.

Capital Tower's anchor tenant is GIC Private Limited.

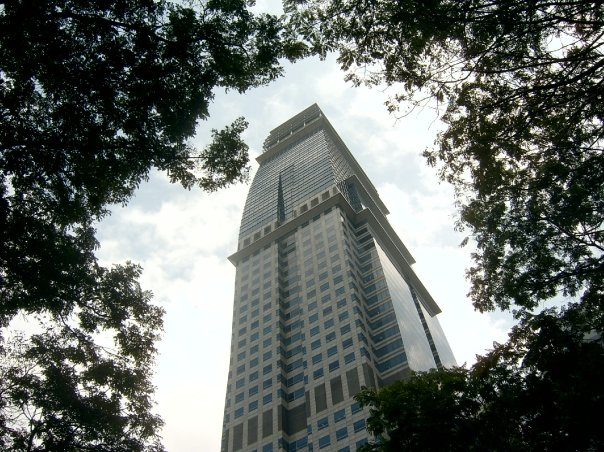
Viewed from a park along Maxwell Road

== See also ==
- List of tallest buildings in Singapore
- List of buildings
