= SGX Centre =

Office skyscraper in Singapore

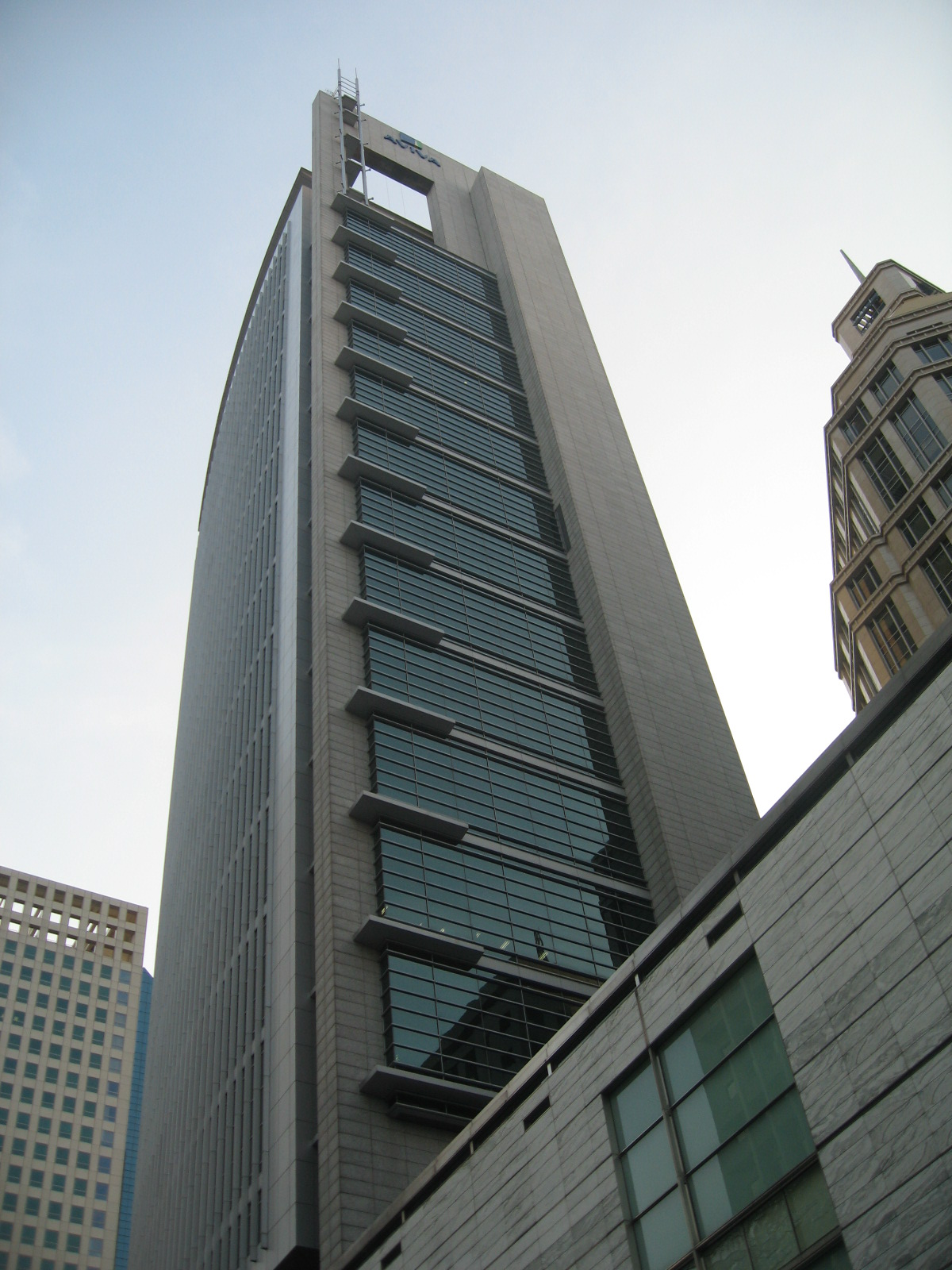
- SGX Centre Two
- Interactive map of the SGX Centre area
- Alternative names: Unity Tower One and Two

General information
- Type: Commercial offices
- Location: Shenton Way, Downtown Core, Singapore
- Coordinates: 1.279042°N 103.849750°E
- Completed: Centre One: 2000; Centre Two: 2001
- Owner: United Overseas Bank

Height
- Antenna spire: Centre One: 187 m (614 ft); Centre Two: 187 m (614 ft)
- Roof: Centre One: 172 m (564 ft); Centre Two: 172 m (564 ft)

Technical details
- Floor count: Centre One: 30; Centre Two: 30

Design and construction
- Architects: Kohn Pedersen Fox Associates; Architects 61 Pte Ltd
- Engineer: Oscar Faber Consultants Pte Ltd; Parsons Brinckerhoff Consultants

SGX Centre is a twin tower high-rise complex in the city of Singapore. The development consists of two 187 m (614 ft) skyscrapers, located in Shenton Way. The two towers are named SGX Centre One and SGX Centre Two, and are situated together on an elongated, rectangular site.

The towers house the Singapore Exchange. A unique feature of the development is that it borders the existing business district, and serves as a gateway to the new downtown at Marina South.

== History ==
SGX Centre One and Two was completed in 2000, and 2001 respectively. The buildings was designed by Kohn Pedersen Fox Associates and the local Architects 61 Pte Ltd.

Other firms involved in the development of SGX Centre includes United Overseas Bank (UOB), Kajima Overseas Asia Private Limited, Oscar Faber Consultants Pte Ltd, Parsons Brinckerhoff Consultants Private Limited, Peridian Asia Private Limited, Bachy Soletanche Singapore Private Limited, Faber Maunsell, KPK Quantity Surveyors (1995), Singapore Private Limited, Manntech Building Maintenance Systems, Permasteelisa S.p.A., and Permasteelisa Pacific Holdings Ltd.

== SGX Centre One ==
Constructed in 2000, SGX Centre One is the older of the twin buildings. It is located on 2 Shenton Way, adjacent to the historic Lau Pa Sat market. The second floor of the building has been housing CNBC Asia's studio facilities since 14 June 2010.

== SGX Centre Two ==
SGX Centre Two is the younger of the twin buildings, and was completed in 2001, a year later than its older brother. Located on 4 Shenton Way, it is adjacent to DBS Building Tower Two, which is part of another development that consists of two high-rises.

== Architecture style ==
The development marked the change of the architectural style in Singapore with the introduction of the millennium. Back then, the favourite architectural style used was brutalist architecture. However, with the completion of SGX Centre came a new era of glass-and-concrete buildings.

The two buildings arc slightly to provide most of its tenants with views of Marina Bay. There are vertical and horizontal fins on different sides of the seemingly simple facade, which according to the Urban Redevelopment Authority, acknowledges subtly the varying rhythms of the city. SGX Centre has colonnaded walkways on the first storey, and a sleek glass curtained lobby, together with a 120-metre long urban mural wall. This contrasts the colonial Lau Pa Sat sited opposite.

== Awards and honors ==
- BCA, Construction Excellence Award (2003)
- BCA Singapore, CONQUAS Award (2003)
- Singapore Institute of Architects, Micro Design Award and Merit Award (2003)
- Singapore Institute of Architects, Micro Design Award and Gold Medal (2003)

== See also ==
- List of tallest buildings in Singapore
- Singapore Exchange
