= The Pinnacle@Duxton =

Residential skyscraper in Singapore

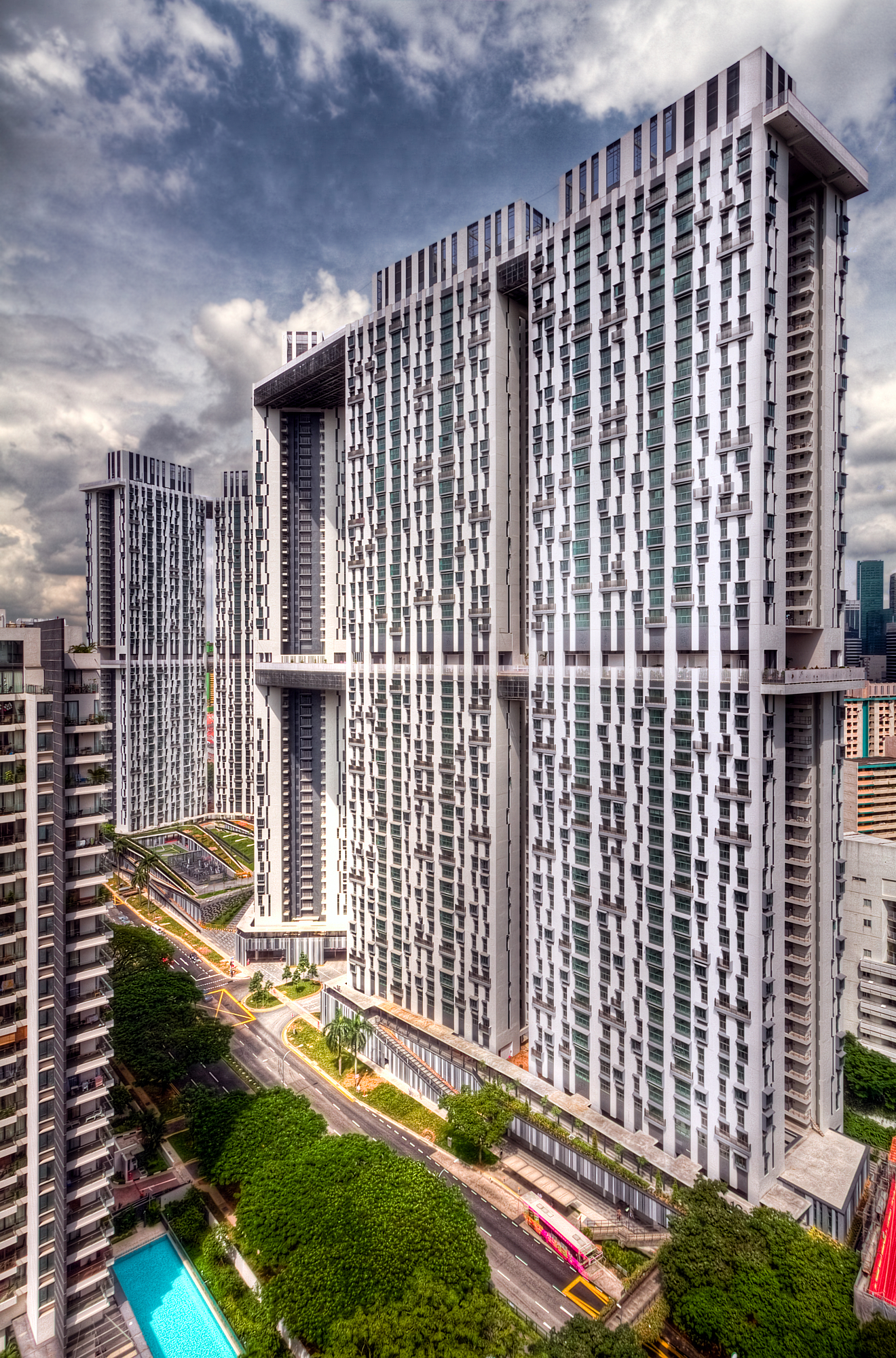
- Interactive map of the The Pinnacle@Duxton area

General information
- Status: Completed
- Type: Public Housing
- Architectural style: High-rise
- Location: Cantonment Road, Singapore
- Coordinates: 1°16′36″N 103°50′29″E
- Construction started: April 2005; 21 years ago
- Completed: 13 December 2009; 16 years ago
- Cost: S$279 million

Height
- Roof: 156 m (512 ft)

Technical details
- Floor count: 50 storeys & basement carpark
- Lifts/elevators: 35

Design and construction
- Architects: Louis Tan, Khoo Peng Beng, Belinda Huang, Sandy Ng, Lim Khim Guan and ARC Studio Architecture + Urbanism in Collaboration with RSP Architects Planners & Engineers
- Developer: Housing and Development Board
- Main contractor: Chip Eng Seng Corporation

The Pinnacle@Duxton is a 50-storey residential development in Singapore's city centre, next to the business district. All seven connected towers are collectively the world's tallest public residential buildings, and featuring the two longest sky gardens ever built on skyscrapers, at 500m each.

Unique amongst Housing and Development Board (HDB) projects, it is the design winner of a worldwide competition which attracted 227 entries from 32 countries. Residences are designated as special types, S1 and S2, having altogether 35 different unit variations – with dissimilar combinations of features such as extended bays, balconies, bay windows and planter areas.

In addition, a viewing gallery on the 52nd storey provides for special events and VIP state visitors. On 8 August 2010, Prime Minister Lee Hsien Loong delivered his annual National Day message from the gallery. Owing to the sky gardens' popularity as an elevated viewing location for National Day firework displays on 9 August, entry for the day may be publicly balloted.

Pinnacle@Duxton was conferred the 2010 Best Tall Building (Asia and Australasia) award by the Council on Tall Buildings and Urban Habitat, as well as the 2011 Urban Land Institute's Global Awards for Excellence.

== History ==
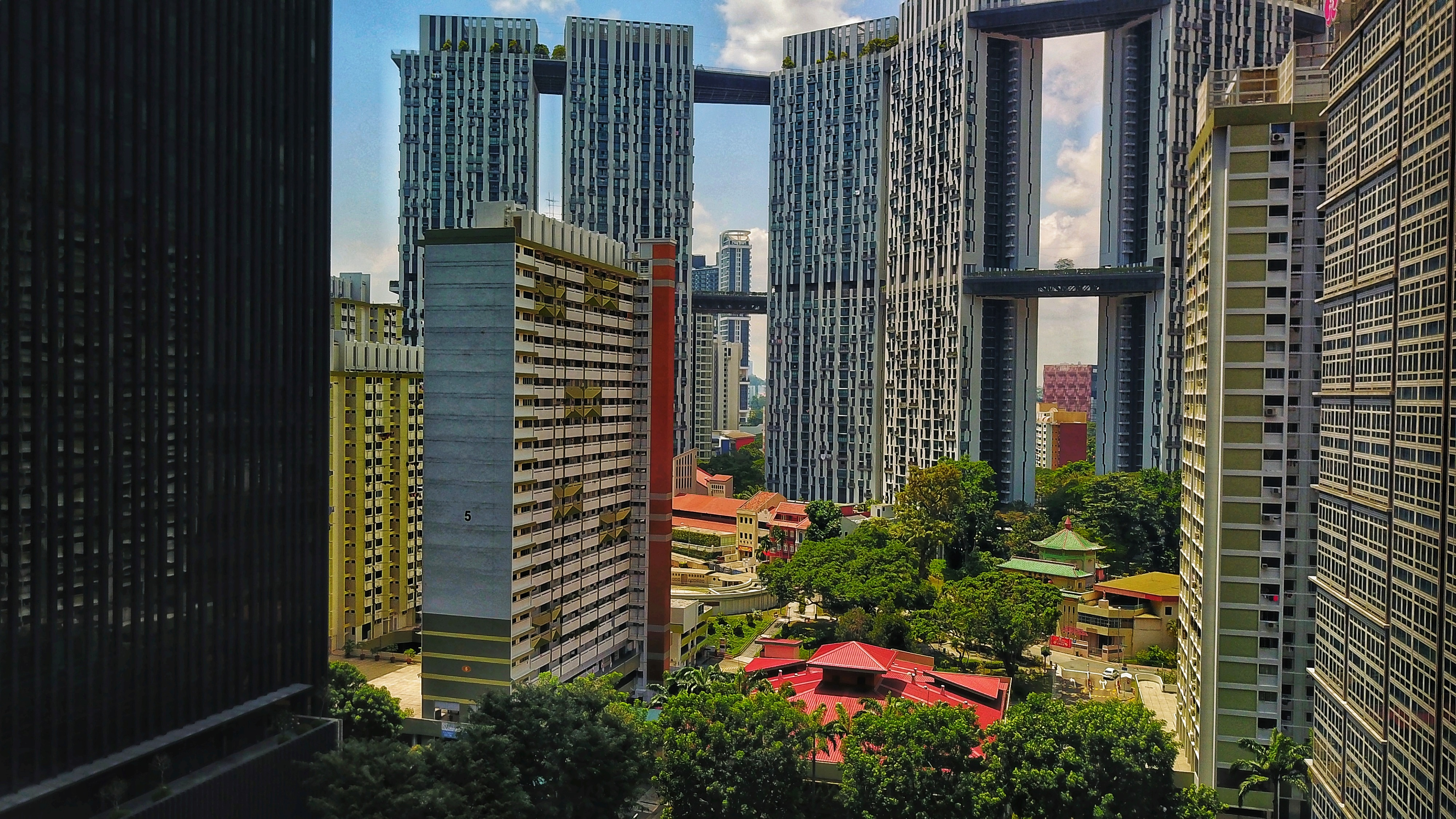
The Tanjong Pagar Housing Estate with the Pinnacle@Duxton in the background

The Duxton Plain site is historically significant as the site of the first two ten-storey HDB blocks in the Tanjong Pagar area and amongst the oldest built by the HDB in the country. Redevelopment of Duxton Plain was initiated by Singapore's founding Prime Minister, former Minister Mentor and Tanjong Pagar's Member of Parliament for 60 years, Lee Kuan Yew in August 2001. to commemorate the historical significance of the previous blocks.

== Design ==
An international architectural design competition was conducted by the Urban Redevelopment Authority on behalf of the Ministry of National Development between 8 August 2001 and 21 September 2001.

The following features were required for entry into the competition:

- Accommodation of the adjacent Community Club, which was built by the People's Association in 1960 as part of the first batch of community centres, so that it formed part of the housing community.
- Landscaping strategies that seamlessly extended the adjacent Duxton Plain Park horizontally and vertically into the development by incorporating rooftop and high-level sky gardens.
- Environmental appropriateness and ability to create a strong sense of ownership. The mature trees around the perimeter of the site, and the jambu ayer and nutmeg trees planted by MM Lee in November 1984 and 1989, were also required to be retained and integrated into the landscaped areas.
- Re-siting of plaques commemorating the laying of the foundation stone on 15 March 1963 and the opening ceremony on 10 April 1964 by the then Prime Minister Lee Kuan Yew.
- As a form of subsidised housing, the proposals had to be cost-effective.

To maximise innovation, the design brief and technical requirements were kept to a minimum, with mainly the mandatory requirements specified.

=== Winning design ===
The competition was keenly contested with 227 entries submitted by design agencies around the world.

It was eventually won by two Singapore architecture companies, ARC Studio Architecture + Urbanism, in collaboration with RSP Architects Planners & Engineers.

The HDB expressed concern about several features of the original design:

- Boulevards of trees along its sky bridges (fear of falling branches).
- Glass panels instead of steel railings for unimpeded views (some people might faint).
- Publicly accessible sky bridges linking its seven tower blocks (security threats to residents).

Some features were modified; notably, the addition of an elevated observation and event room on the 52nd floor of tower 1C, likely to cater for visiting VIPs.

HDB set stringent standards for the construction, the design and finishes required for the tender veered towards private housing standards. Units at The Pinnacle@Duxton were also more fully furnished than the average HDB project. The design exceeded standards of private condominiums so much that it caused concern amongst private developers regarding their future if public housing was developed in a similar manner. The HDB had to reassure them that this project was a one-off special residential development. The Pinnacle@Duxton received much publicity in the media when it was launched in May 2004.

Subsequently, the S$279-million construction contract was awarded to Chip Eng Seng Corporation, the lowest of the bids submitted. The foundation was laid by MM Lee. Fully pre-cast methods were used during construction, which could be 10–15 per cent more expensive than the traditional way of pumping wet concrete all the way to the top. Pre-cast methods involve transporting moulded components to the site and hoisting them up on to the structure.

== Sales launch ==
The showflat was launched on 29 May 2004 when HDB released 528 units under phase 1 of its Build-To-Order system. Units quickly became oversubscribed with the HDB receiving more than a hundred enquiries by telephone and e-mail even before sales began. Originally set to be launched in phases, the HDB subsequently decided to release all the units for sale due to overwhelming response.

The Pinnacle@Duxton project holds the record for the highest average price of new flats purchased directly from HDB, as well as the most expensive unit offered and purchased at $646,000.

In September 2020, the development held the record for both of the most popular sizes of 5-room and 4-room HDB units at $1.23 million and $1.19 million.

The key handing over ceremony was held on 13 December 2009, marking the completion of the project. Minister Mentor and Member of Parliament Mr Lee Kuan Yew was the Guest-of-Honour for the ceremony.

=== Features ===
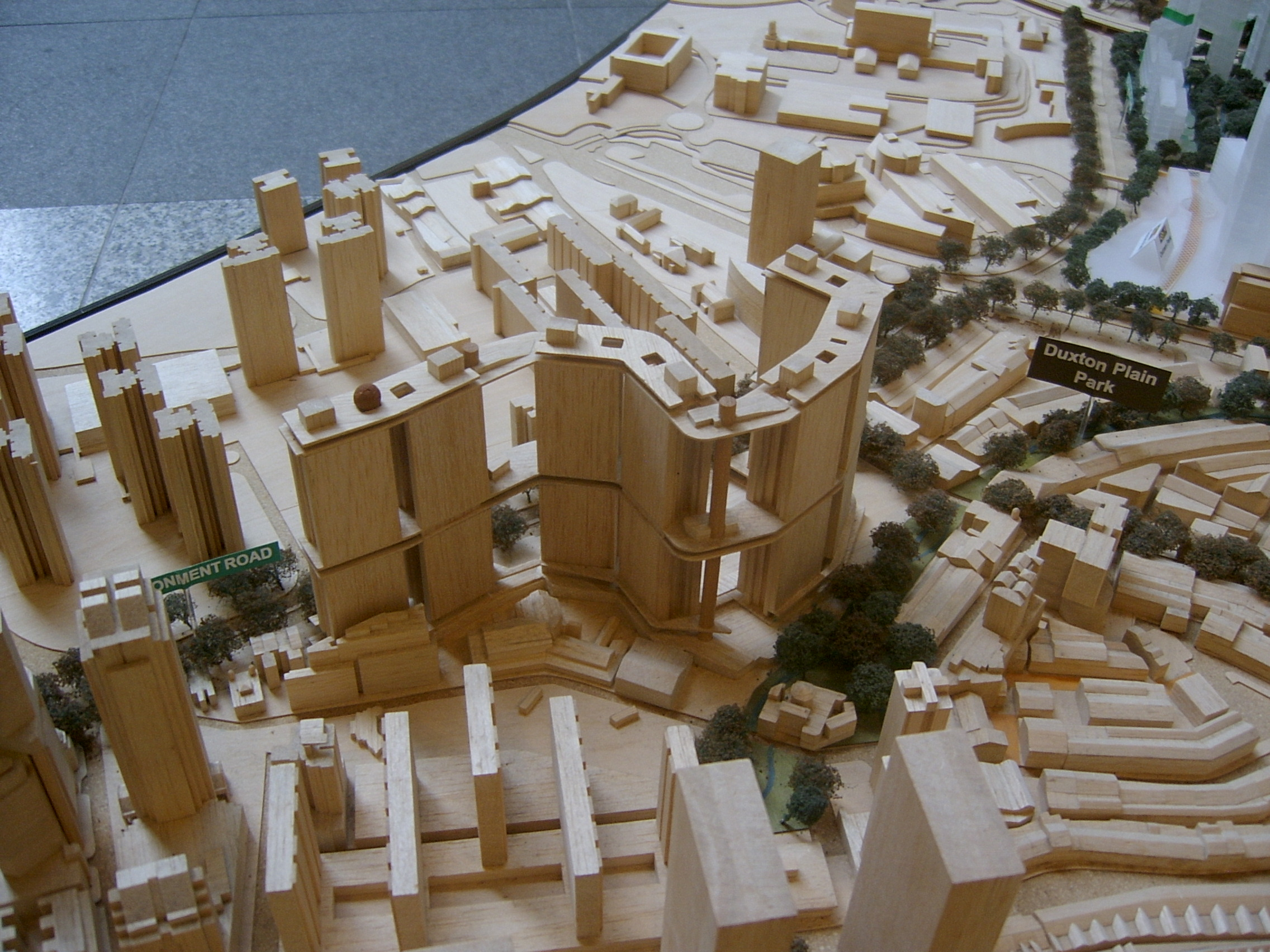
A model on display at the URA Singapore City Gallery

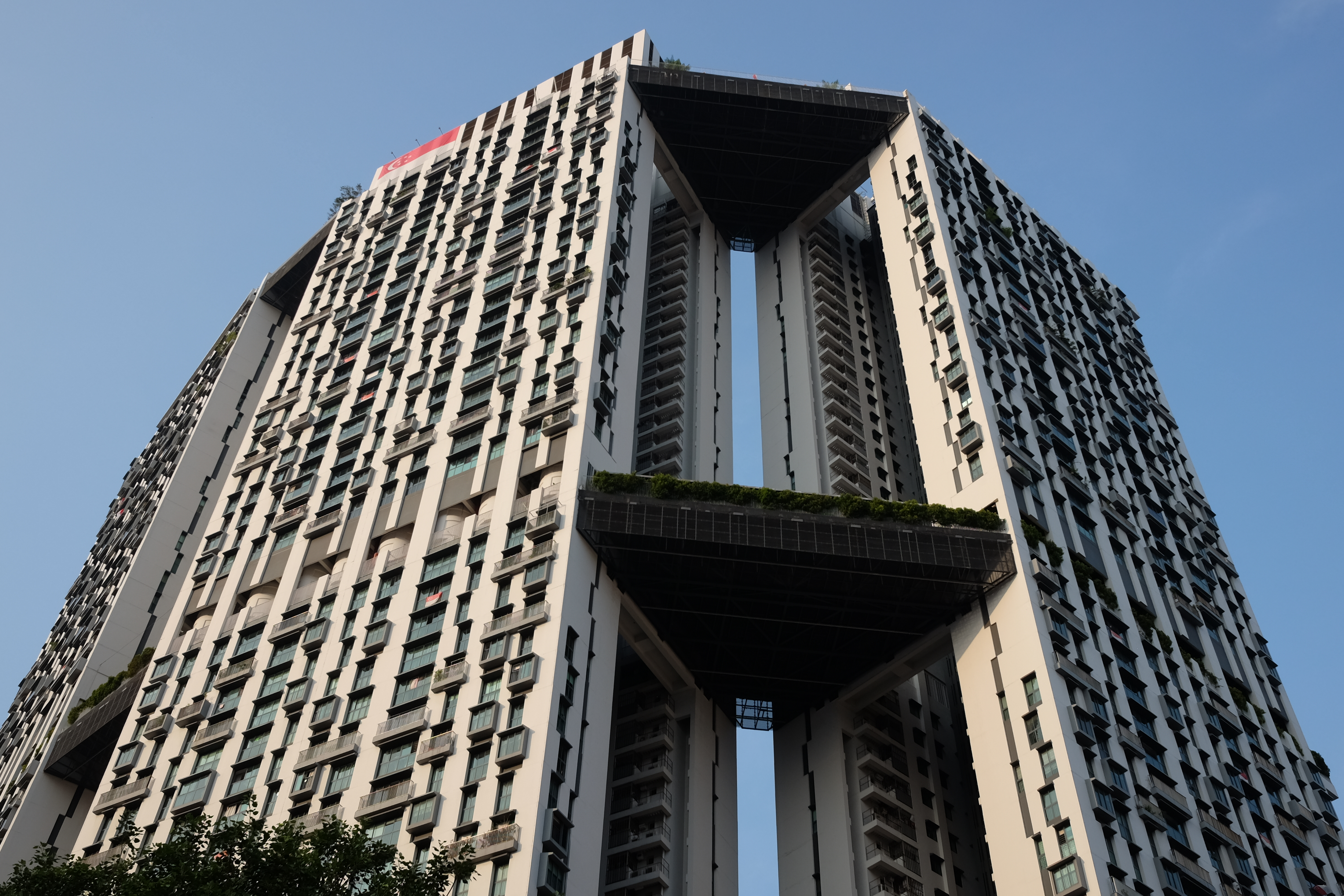
The Pinnacle@Duxton seen from street level, after Singapore National Day

All seven towers in the development are collectively the world's tallest public housing residential buildings. They are linked at the 26th and 50th floors by the world's two longest sky gardens of 500m each.

The sky gardens at both levels incorporate jogging tracks, with playgrounds, rest and viewing areas, features which are unique and pioneering for skyscrapers at that time. Other facilities include a food centre, basketball court, daycare centre, underground car park and other sports and recreational facilities. The 26th floor sky garden is only accessible to residents, whilst the 50th floor sky garden is accessible to the public, from 9am to 9pm. However, the 50th floor sky garden has a general admission fee of SGD 6, whilst there is a strict daily general access quota of 150 people per day and also a maximum occupancy of 50 people at any given time.

Buyers are able to choose their flat's layout from combinations of balconies, planter boxes and/or bay windows. Also, the internal lightweight concrete walls can be easily removed and reconfigured by owners.

New fire safety regulations were also drawn up by the Singapore Civil Defence Force which involved the use of elevators during any evacuation. The Pinnacle@Duxton is the first development to be affected by these regulations. Refugee floors and special firefighting points were also provided for under the new code.

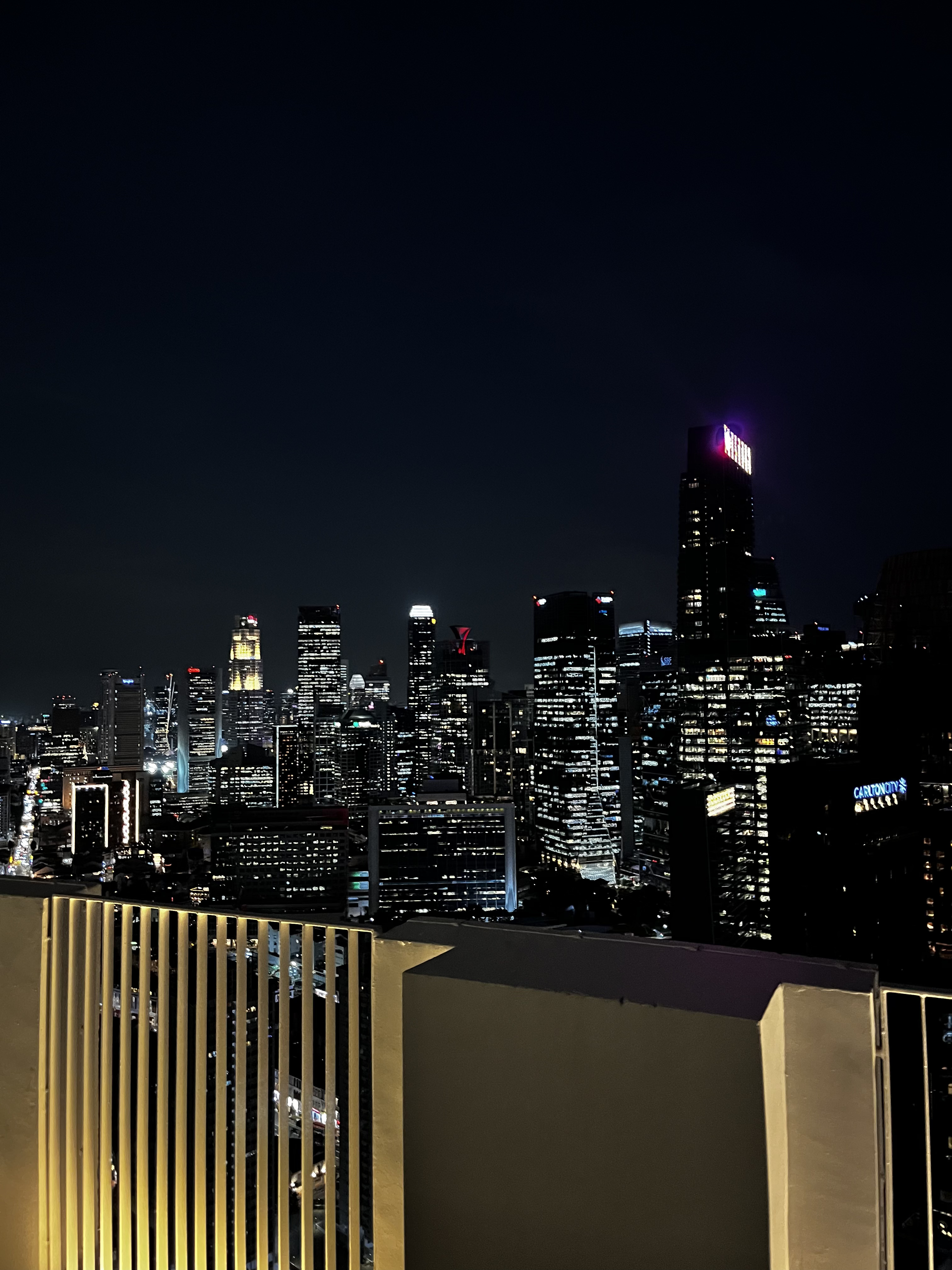
A picture of Pinnacle at Duxton at night from July 2025

== See also ==
- Housing and Development Board
- List of tallest buildings in Singapore
