= International Plaza (Singapore) =

Mixed-use skyscraper in Singapore

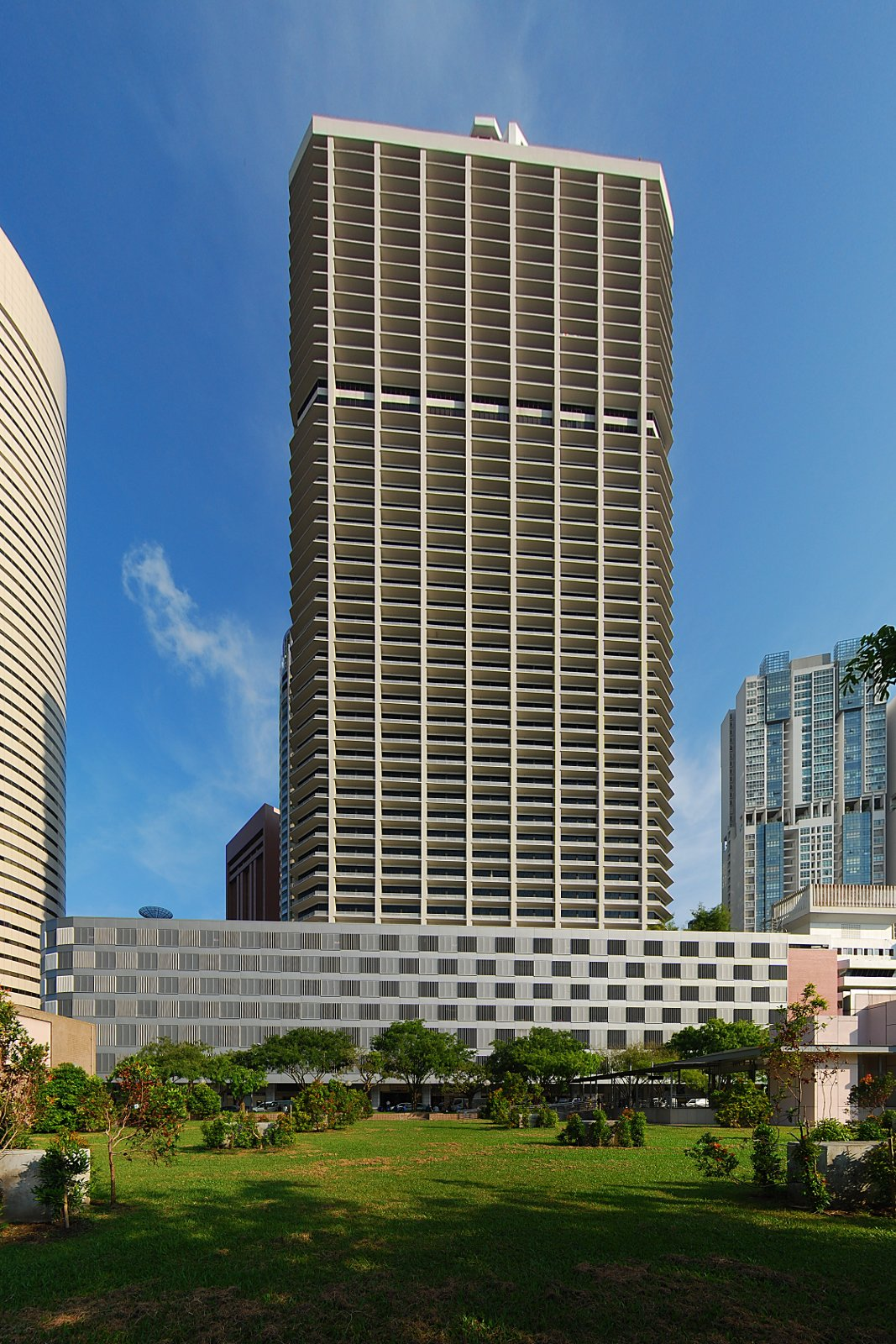
- Interactive map of the International Plaza area

General information
- Status: Completed
- Type: Commercial offices Residential condominiums
- Architectural style: Modernism
- Location: 10 Anson Road, Singapore 079903
- Coordinates: 1°16′33.5″N 103°50′43.9″E
- Completed: 7 June 1976; 50 years ago
- Renovated: 1985
- Cost: $3.2 million
- Owner: International Associated Co Pte Ltd
- Operator: International Associated Co Pte Ltd

Technical details
- Floor count: 50
- Lifts/elevators: 28

Design and construction
- Architects: Ang Kheng Leng & Associates

International Plaza is a high-rise commercial and residential building at 10 Anson Road in Tanjong Pagar, within the Downtown Core of Singapore, next to Tanjong Pagar MRT station on the East West line.

It currently houses the Honorary Consulate of Malta on the 15th floor and the Honorary Consulate of Tuvalu on the 25th floor of the building.

== History ==
In 1966, the Urban Renewal Department of the Housing and Development Board was formed to facilitate greater flexibility and autonomy in comprehensive redevelopment of Singapore's Central Area. The development of International Plaza was the result of the department's third Sales of Sites programme in 1969.

To avoid affecting operations within the building, construction of the International Plaza was carried out in three phases. The first phase involved the construction of a seven-storey commercial and retail podium. This was followed by the second phase of building the office tower. The last phase was construction of the apartment units and penthouses above the offices.

Built at a cost of S$52.8 million and completed on 7 June 1976, the 50-storey International Plaza was one of the pioneers Singapore in the 1970s of integrating multiple operations into a single mixed-use development.

In 1985 owners carried out a minor upgrade, involving an interior retrofitting and the addition of an external glass wall to achieve the desired overall thermal transfer value rating. International Plaza's refurbishment cost S$15 million. The building had an elaborate LED facade installed, as part of the Singapore Government's plan to light up buildings in the central business district.

With a height of 190 metres (623 ft), the International Plaza was one of the three tallest buildings in Singapore when it was completed in 1976; the other two were OCBC Centre (201 metres; 659 feet) and DBS Building (186 metres; 610 feet). International Plaza was the tallest commercial building with residential apartments in Singapore. International Plaza was superseded by The Sail @ Marina Bay in 2008.

== Amenities and architecture ==
The architectural firm Ang Kheng Leng and Associates (1955–97), later Ang Kheng Leng and Partners (1997–2005), designed the International Plaza. Integrating apartments, sports facilities, offices and a retail mall in a single building, International Plaza epitomises the concept of living and working in the financial hub of the city. The building's design aspires to set a concept of work-life balance for its occupants, with its multiple functions and vertically stacked amenities. International Plaza achieves its objective as a self-sufficient, downtown apartment block, making it one of the most highly successful projects of this nature to date.

Located on a 6,976-square metre (75,090 square feet) site at the junction of Choon Guan Street and Anson Road, the 50-storey commercial and residential skyscraper comprises a seven-storey triangular podium that houses a shopping centre and multi-storey carpark, and a 43-storey, octagonal-shaped tower block for offices, apartments and penthouses. International Plaza is a large mixed development with a total gross floor area of 137,930 square metres (1,484,700 square feet), built around two large internal courtyards. The entire complex is fully air-conditioned, and serviced by 20 high-speed lifts and four escalators.

The shopping mall with 270 shops is located on the ground to third storey, and the carpark, from the fourth to eighth storey. The car-parking area on the lower levels had its own lift system which, during peak hours, resulted in much confusion and traffic congestion until the whole system was completely upgraded in 1985 as part of an interior retrofitting.

The 388-unit offices are spread over the ninth to 35th storey on the tower block. The complex offers a swimming pool, health club and other recreational facilities on the 36th storey. The residential block, which is located from the 37th to 50th storey, offers a variety of apartments, from single-room, two-bedroom, three-bedroom apartments to four-bedroom penthouses on the top floor. The building has a roof garden with scenic views of the city for its residents.

== See also ==
- List of tallest buildings in Singapore
