= Robinson 77 =

Office skyscraper in Singapore

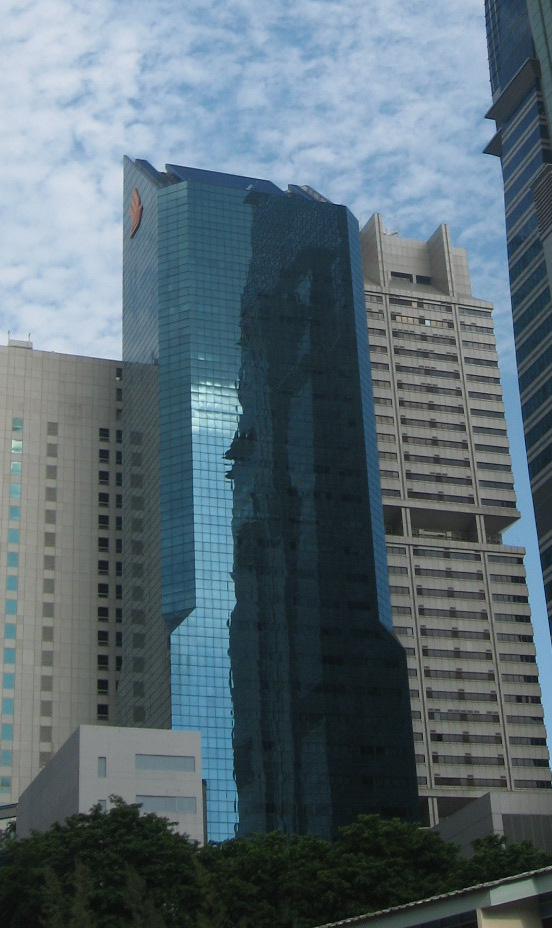
- Robinson 77 in 2006
- Former names: SIA Building; Singapore Airlines Head Office

General information
- Status: Completed
- Type: Commercial offices
- Architectural style: Modernism
- Location: 77 Robinson Road, Singapore 068896
- Coordinates: 1.277558°N 103.848318°E
- Completed: 1997
- Owner: Gaw Capital Partners (CITIC Group)
- Operator: SEB Investment

Height
- Roof: 176 m (577 ft)

Technical details
- Floor count: 35

Design and construction
- Architect: SAA Partnership
- Structural engineer: T. Y. Lin International
- Main contractor: Obayashi Gumi Corporation

Robinson 77, previously called the SIA Building, is a high-rise skyscraper located in the central business district of Singapore. The building is located on 77 Robinson Road, just next to DBS Building Tower One and Two.

Once the flagship building of Singapore Airlines, the airline sold the building to SEB Investment in 2006. It is currently owned by CITIC Group, a state-owned investment company of the People's Republic of China.

The building has a net floor area of around 27,400 m^{2} (295,000 sq ft). It has a total of 180 car park lots.

== History ==
SIA Building was designed by Obayashi Gumi Corporation, and SAA Partnership, and structural engineering of the development was done by T. Y. Lin International. Construction of the building was completed in 1998. Other firms involved in the development included Singapore Airlines, PCR Engineers Private Limited, PCR Engineers Private Limited, Rider Hunt Levett & Bailey, Levett & Bailey Chart, and Quantity Surveyors Ltd.

== Architecture ==
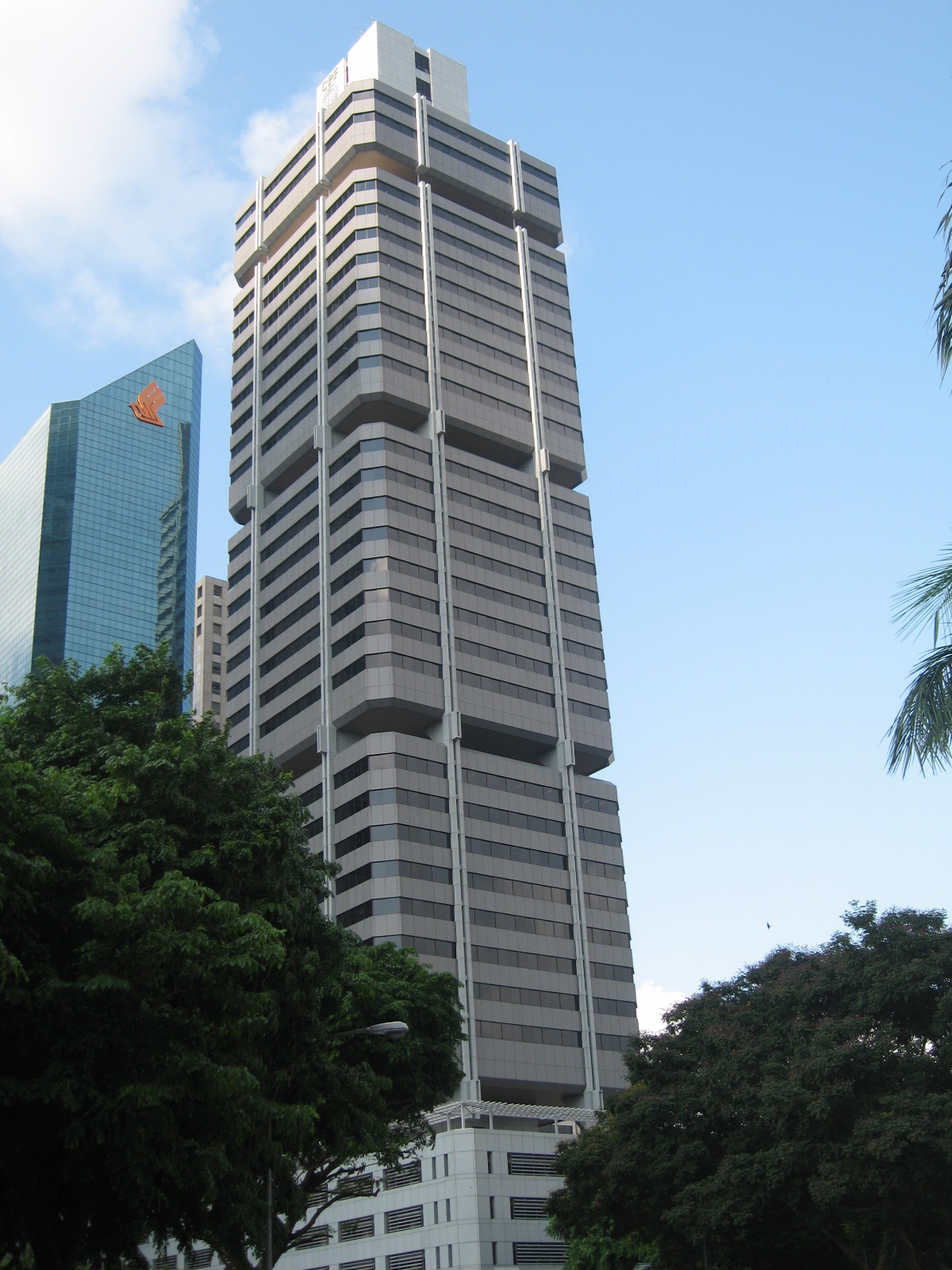
SIA building with its tail fin design (left) and CPF building

The SIA Building was one of the first high-rises in Singapore with its exterior made out of glass. As the flagship building for Singapore Airlines, it bears the Singapore Airlines' logo. The roof of the building also incorporates a vertical stabilizer design, similar to that of an airplane.

== Selling of building ==
In 2006, Singapore Airlines sold the SIA Building to TSO Investment, which is a unit of a real estate fund managed by CLSA Capital Partners. It comes at a price of S$343.9 million, which amounts to some $1,165 per square foot. According to the company, the sale was "in line with the non-core business strategy". It was valued at $118.8 million then. SIA subsequently used proceeds from the sale for investment and growing the company and its subsidiaries.

In 2011 SEB Investment announced the company would be selling the building.

In 2015 it was announced again that SEB Investment would be selling the building, but the disposition plan was subsequently cancelled as the company was undergoing a change of ownership and management. The property is currently held by Savills Fund Management (which was previously known as SEB Investment GmbH) The property was sold in 2016 back to a fund managed by CLSA. CLSA, who refurbished parts of the building during 2017 and 2018 intends to sell it on in late 2018.

== See also ==
- Singapore Airlines
- List of tallest buildings in Singapore
