= Robinson Road, Singapore =

Street in Singapore

Robinson Road
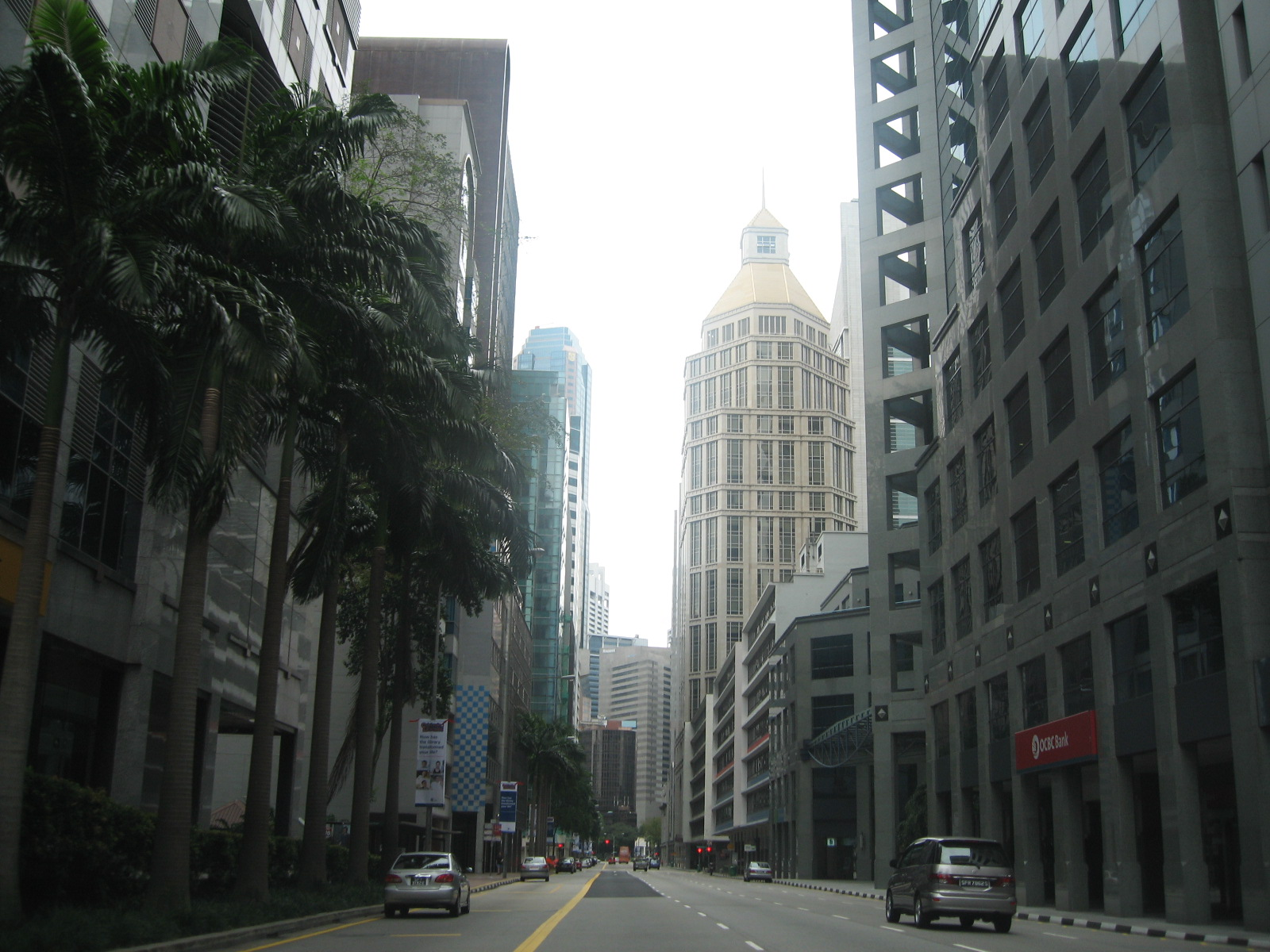
- Robinson Road, Singapore
- Interactive map of Robinson Road
- Native name: 罗敏申路 (Chinese)
- Namesake: William Cleaver Francis Robinson
- Type: Major trunk road
- Owner: Land Transport Authority
- Maintained by: Land Transport Authority
- Location: Downtown Core, Singapore
- Coordinates: 1.279°N 103.849°E
- From: Collyer Quay
- To: Anson Road

Robinson Road (Chinese: 罗敏申路) is a major trunk road in Singapore's Central Area. The road is named after Sir William Cleaver Francis Robinson, the Governor of the Straits Settlements in 1877–1879. The land on which Robinson Road now stands was created through land reclamation work that began in 1879. It was a seaside thoroughfare until more land reclamation work in Telok Ayer Basin in the early 1900s (completed in 1932) shifted the shoreline further east to make room for the building of Shenton Way. This allowed for the road to be widened and converted into a one-way street to accommodate the rise in traffic flow pending massive urban development. Today, it is flanked on both sides by major skyscrapers and lends its name to several buildings, including Robinson Centre and Robinson Point.
