= Lippo Centre (Singapore) =

Office skyscraper in Singapore

78 Shenton Way
- Interactive map of the 78 Shenton Way area

General information
- Status: Completed
- Type: Commercial offices
- Location: Shenton Way, Singapore
- Coordinates: 1°16′23.03″N 103°50′40.38″E
- Completed: 1990
- Cost: $35 million

Height
- Roof: 150 m (490 ft)

Technical details
- Floor count: 34
- Lifts/elevators: 12

Design and construction
- Architects: Raymond Woo and Associates Architects

Lippo Center is a 150 m (490 ft) skyscraper located at 78 Shenton Way in Singapore's Downtown Core. It was completed in 1990, has 34 floors, and is tied with two buildings of The Gateway as the 43rd-tallest building in the city-state. It was sold to Commerz Real AG for US$650 million in December 2007.

Resource Pacific Holdings Pte Ltd, a company that is located on the 28th floor of the Lippo Center, currently houses the Honorary Consulate of Jamaica.

== See also ==
- List of tallest buildings in Singapore
