= List of tallest buildings in Singapore =

Skyline of Singapore
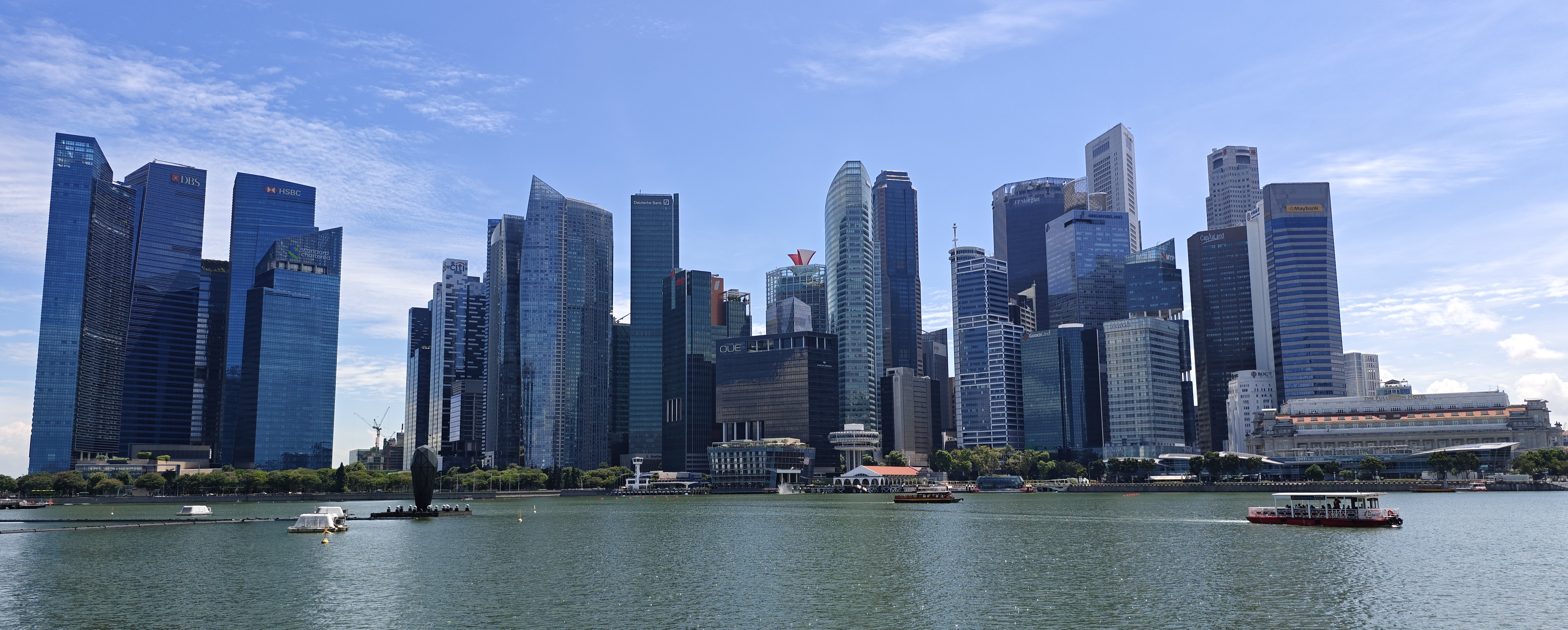
- Skyline of Singapore in 2025
- Tallest building: Guoco Tower (2015)
- Tallest building height: 290 m (950 ft)
- First 150 m+ building: The Mandarin Singapore Tower Two (1973)

Number of tall buildings (2026)
- Taller than 100 m (328 ft): ~550
- Taller than 150 m (492 ft): 140
- Taller than 200 m (656 ft): 36

Singapore is a highly urbanised country with over 10,000 completed high-rises, the majority of which are located in the Downtown Core, its central business district (CBD). In the CBD, there are over 100 skyscrapers. The Guoco Tower currently holds the title of the tallest building in Singapore. It stands at 290 m (950 ft), exempted from the height restriction of 280 m (920 ft) in the CBD. A supertall tower, the Skywaters Residences is being built at the current AXA Tower site. Standing at 305 m (1,001 ft), it is expected to be completed by 2028.

Singapore's history of skyscrapers began with the 1939 completion of the 17-storey Cathay Building. The 70-metre (230 ft) structure was, at the time of its completion, the tallest building in Southeast Asia; it was superseded by the 87-metre (285 ft) Asia Insurance Building in 1954, which remained the tallest in Singapore for more than a decade. Singapore went through a major building boom in the 1970s and 1980s that resulted from the city's rapid industrialisation. During this time OUB Centre (present-day One Raffles Place) became the tallest building in the city-state; the 280 m (919 ft) structure was also the tallest building in the world outside of North America from its 1986 completion until 1989. The skyscraper-building boom continued during the 1990s and 2000s, with 30 skyscrapers at least 140 m (459 ft) tall, many of them residential towers, constructed from 1990 through 2008.

Since 2000, there has been a sharp increase in the number of skyscrapers under construction in the city area, particularly in the Marina Bay district. One project completed in Marina Bay is the Marina Bay Financial Centre, which includes 3 office towers offering 280,000 square metres (3,000,000 sq ft) of office space, 2 residential developments offering 649 apartments and a 16,400-square-metre (176,000 sq ft) retail mall, named Marina Bay Link Mall. There are also several new developments in the city's shopping hub, Orchard Road. The Orchard Residences is a 218 m (715 ft), 52-floor tower built in conjunction with ION Orchard, a shopping centre just beside Orchard MRT station. In addition, the 245 m (804 ft) Ocean Financial Centre, a 43-floor skyscraper, is built in Raffles Place. With the Jurong Lake District envisioned as Singapore's second CBD, more skyscrapers are shaping the skyline there as well. The JTC Summit, a 142 m (466 ft) office tower built in 2000, currently stands as the tallest building outside the Central Region of the country.

A height restriction imposed on Singapore's central business district (CBD) limits buildings to a maximum height of 280 meters unless special permission to build higher is granted. It is in place due to the location of Paya Lebar Air Base. After the base's expected decommissioning in 2030, the restriction will be lifted.

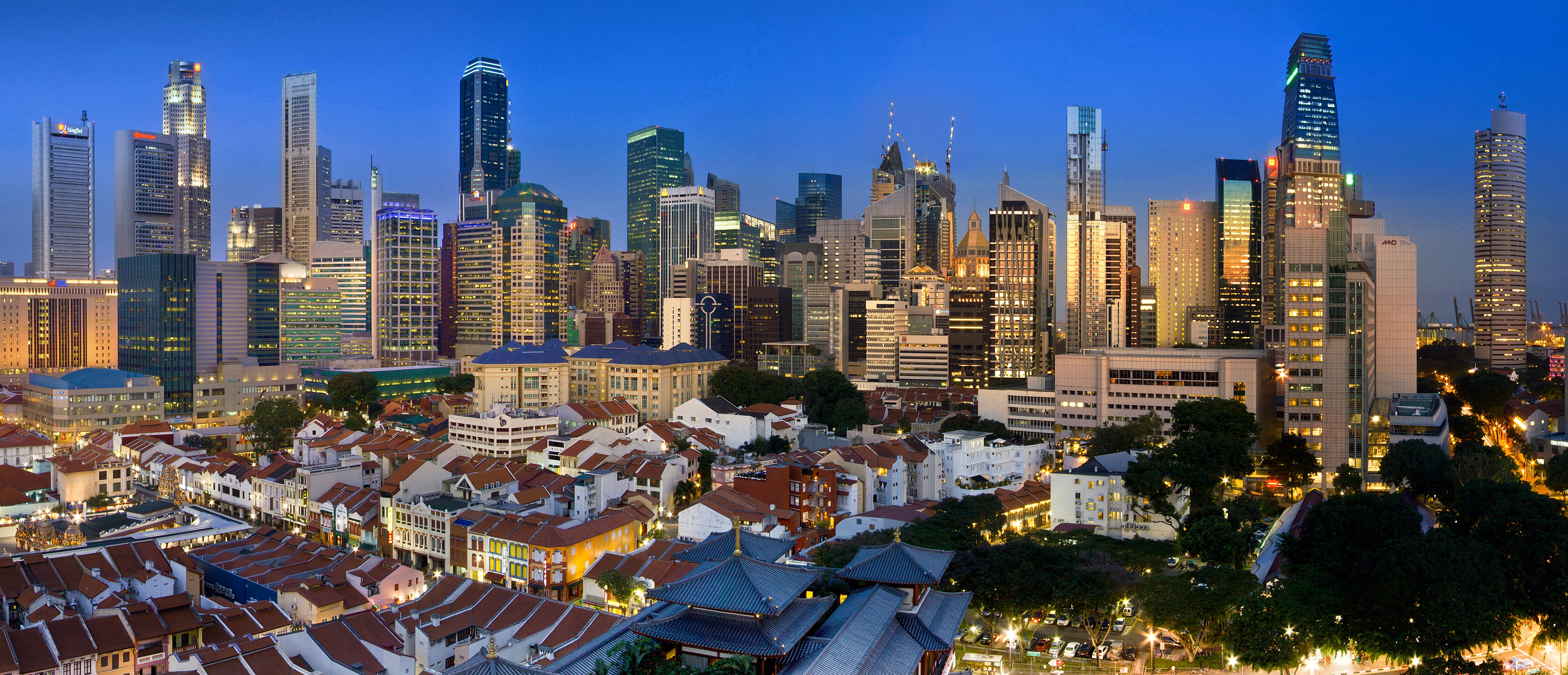
Panorama of Singapore's skyline at dusk (2010)

== Tallest buildings ==
This lists ranks Singapore skyscrapers that stand at least 150 m (492 ft) tall, based on standard height measurement. This includes spires and architectural details but does not include antenna masts. An equal sign (=) following a rank indicates the same height between two or more buildings. The "Year" column indicates the year in which a building was completed.

Was the tallest building in Southeast Asia upon completion

Rank	Name	Image	Height (m)	Height (ft)	Floors	Year	Coordinates	Notes
1	Guoco Tower		283.7	950	65	2016	1°16′37.560″N 103°50′45.960″E	The tallest building in Singapore since 2016. Initially planned for 290 m, a permission had to be obtained to build it above the height limit of 280 m allowable for buildings in Singapore, Tallest building constructed in Singapore in the 2010s
2=	One Raffles Place	Ground-level view of 60-storey building whose cross section is a square with a diagonal projection from one corner. In the top 10 storeys part of the square is missing and only a diagonal remains.	280	919	63	1986	1°17′04.89″N 103°51′03.70″E	Formerly OUB Centre. Tallest building outside North America from 1986 until the 1989 completion of the Bank of China Tower in Hong Kong; was tied with Republic Plaza and United Overseas Bank Plaza One as the tallest building in Singapore and the 123rd-tallest in the world. Tallest building constructed in Singapore in the 1980s
2=	United Overseas Bank Plaza One	Ground-level view of several skyscrapers; the building on the right is the tallest and has a square cross section with several diagonal protrusions. A shorter building on the left resembles it closely.	280	919	62	1995	1°17′08″N 103°50′59″E	Tied with One Raffles Place and Republic Plaza as the tallest building in Singapore and the 123rd-tallest in the world; tied as the tallest building constructed in Singapore in the 1990s
2=	Republic Plaza	Ground-level view of 70-storey building. The exterior has a reddish hue with dark windows. The building tapers slightly at two points.	280	919	66	1998	1°16′58″N 103°51′04″E	Tied with United Overseas Bank Plaza One and One Raffles Place in Singapore and the 123rd-tallest in the world; tied as the tallest building constructed in Singapore in the 1990s
2=	CapitaSpring	Ground-level view of a 50-storey building, distinct architecture features modern hole designs with trees in them.	280	919	51	2021	1°17′01″N 103°51′00″E	
6	Capital Tower	Ground-level view of a 50-storey building with a rectangular cross section; near the 40th floor the building tapers inward.	254	833	52	2000	1°16′39″N 103°50′51″E	182nd-tallest building in the world; tallest building constructed in Singapore in the 2000s
7=	Altez		250	820	62	2014	1°16′28.2″N 103°50′39.5″E	Tied with Skysuites @ Anson as the tallest residential building in Singapore
7=	Skysuites @ Anson		250	820	72	2014	1°16′28.2″N 103°50′41.1″E	Tied with Altez as the tallest residential building in Singapore
9=	One Raffles Quay North Tower		245	804	50	2006	1°16′53.04″N 103°51′6.52″E	
9=	The Sail @ Marina Bay Tower 1	Ground-level view of two curved buildings that slightly resemble sails; the sun is setting in the distance.	245	804	70	2008	1°16′51.97″N 103°51′10.06″E	Also known as the Marina Bay Tower
9=	CapitaGreen		245	804	40	2011	1°16′54.840″N 103°51′1.080″E	
9=	Ocean Financial Centre		245	804	43	2011	1°16′59.52″N 103°51′10.77″E	
9=	Marina Bay Financial Centre Tower 2		245	804	45	2012	1°16′48.13″N 103°51′15.08″E	
9=	IOI Central Boulevard Towers (West Tower)		245	804	46	2023	1°16′47.203″N 103°51′5.299″E	
15	Marina Bay Financial Centre Tower 3		239	784	46	2010	1°16′48.13″N 103°51′15.08″E	
16	V on Shenton		237	778	54	2017	1°16′40.51″N 103°50′58.49″E	
17	Frasers Tower		235	770	38	2018		
18	Asia Square Tower 1		229	751	43	2011	1.2788°N 103.8516°E	
19=	Marina Bay Residences		227	745	61	2011	1°16′48.13″N 103°51′15.08″E	
19=	Marina Bay Suites		227	784	66	2014	1°16′49.08″N 103°51′7.2″E	
21	Swissôtel The Stamford	Ground-level view of a tall, white cylindrical tower and a shorter cuboidal building	226	741	73	1986	1°17′36″N 103°51′12″E	Tallest hotel in Singapore; tallest hotel in the world at time of completion; highest floor count in Singapore
22=	Marina One East Tower		225	740	30	2018	1°16′37.73″N 103°51′14.45″E	
22=	Marina One West Tower		225	740	30	2018	1°16′37.73″N 103°51′14.45″E	
24	Millenia Tower	Side view of a 40-story building with a square cross section; the building tapers into a partial pyramid near the roofline.	223	732	41	1996	1°17′34″N 103°51′37″E	
25	Asia Square Tower 2		221	727	46	2013	1.2781°N 103.8512°E	
26=	The Orchard Residences	Side view of a 56-storey building attached to a luxury shopping mall in the foreground.	218	715	56	2010	1°18′15.01″N 103°49′54.2″E	
26=	South Beach North Tower		218	715	35	2015	1°17′42″N 103°51′22″E	
26=	South Beach South Tower		218	715	45	2015	1°17′42″N 103°51′22″E	
29	The Sail @ Marina Bay Tower 2	Ground-level view of two curved buildings that slightly resemble sails; the sun is setting in the distance.	215	705	63	2008	1°16′51.97″N 103°51′10.06″E	Also known as the Central Park Tower
30	One Shenton Way Tower 1		214	702	50	2011	1.2793°N 103.8505°E	
31	Singapore Land Tower		213	699	49	1980; 2024 (Refurbished)	1.2846°N 103.8518°E	First built in 1980, Singapore Land Tower was closed for refurbishment in 2021. Two additional floors were added, increasing the floor count of the building from 47-storeys to 49-storeys.
32	One Raffles Place Tower 2		209	686	38	2012	1°17′04.89″N 103°51′03.70″E	
33=	Keppel South Central		207	679	33	2025		
33=	Marina Bay Sands Tower 1	Three towers are joined by a terrace that stretches out between their respective roofs, protruding over the edge of each tower.	207	679	57	2009	1°17′7.9″N 103°51′39.34″E	
33=	Marina Bay Sands Tower 2	Three towers are joined by a terrace that stretches out between their respective roofs, protruding over the edge of each tower.	207	679	57	2009	1°17′7.9″N 103°51′39.34″E	
33=	Marina Bay Sands Tower 3	Three towers are joined by a terrace that stretches out between their respective roofs, protruding over the edge of each tower.	207	679	57	2009	1°17′7.9″N 103°51′39.34″E	
37	OUE Downtown Tower 1		201	659	50	1975	1°16′37.40″N 103°50′54.06″E	Tallest building constructed in Singapore in the 1970s
38	Shaw Tower		200	656	35	2026		
39	OCBC Centre	Ground level view of a box-like building with rounded, windowless side exteriors	198	650	52	1976	1°17′07″N 103°50′57″E	
40	Oasia Hotel Downtown		193	634	27	2016		
41=	Guoco Midtown		192	630	30	2024		
41=	Marina Bay Financial Centre Tower 1		192	630	33	2010	1°16′48.13″N 103°51′15.08″E	
41=	Avenue South Residence Tower 1		192	630	56	2023		
41=	Avenue South Residence Tower 2		192	630	56	2023		
45	International Plaza	Ground-level view of 50-storey box-like building with dark, receded windows and cut-off, diagonal corners	190	623	50	1976	1°16′33.5″N 103°50′43.9″E	
46=	SGX Centre One	Ground-level view of a 30-storey building with a rounded, glass facade on one side and a straight-edged facade of concrete and windows on another; the concrete siding protrudes above the roofline	187	614	30	2000	1°16′46.97″N 103°51′0.06″E	
46=	SGX Centre Two	Ground-level view of a 30-storey building with a rounded, glass facade on one side and a straight-edged facade of concrete and windows on another; the concrete siding protrudes above the roofline	187	614	30	2001	1°16′43.81″N 103°50′57.97″E	
46=	SBF Center	Ground-level view of a 31-storey building with a glass facade	187	614	31	2016		
49	DUO Residences		186	610	50	2018		
50	CapitaSky	-	185	607	29	2022	1°16′36.61″N 103°50′52.12″E	Also known as ASB Tower
51=	Labrador Tower		183	600	34	2024		
51=	mTower		183	600	42	1986	1°16′24.87″N 103°48′04.37″E	Formerly known as PSA Building
52=	Suntec City Tower 1	Ground-level view of two identical 45-storey towers with rectangular cross sections; a diagonal cut-out is present on each tower near the 30th floor	181	594	45	1997	1°17′40″N 103°51′30″E	
52=	Suntec City Tower 2	Ground-level view of two identical 45-storey towers with rectangular cross sections; a diagonal cut-out is present on each tower near the 30th floor	181	594	45	1997	1°17′40″N 103°51′30″E	
52=	Suntec City Tower 3	Ground-level view of two identical 45-storey towers with rectangular cross sections; a diagonal cut-out is present on each tower near the 30th floor	181	594	45	1997	1°17′40″N 103°51′30″E	
52=	Suntec City Tower 4	Ground-level view of two identical 45-storey towers with rectangular cross sections; a diagonal cut-out is present on each tower near the 30th floor	181	594	45	1997	1°17′40″N 103°51′30″E	
56=	18 Robinson		180	591	28	2019		
56=	Canninghill Piers Tower 1		180	591	48	2025		
58=	16 Collyer Quay	Ground-level view of a 40-storey building with a glass facade and rectangular cross section; three levels of windows recede inward at various points up the tower, and a spire is present on the roof.	179	587	33	1993	1°17′03.08″N 103°51′08.72″E	
58=	DUO Tower		179	587	39	2018		
60=	One Pearl Bank 1		178	583	39	2024		
60=	One Pearl Bank 2		178	583	39	2024		
60=	Reflections at Keppel Bay Tower 1B		178	583	41	2011		
60=	Reflections at Keppel Bay Tower 2B		178	583	41	2011		
60=	Reflections at Keppel Bay Tower 3B		178	583	41	2011		
60=	State Courts Towers	–	178	583	35	2019		Tallest government building in Singapore
60=	One Shenton Tower 2		178	583	42	2011	1.2793°N 103.8505°E	
67	Pickering Operations Complex	Ground-level view of a 40-storey, box-like building with windowless concrete siding and rounded anterior corners	177	581	43	1986	1°17′6.84″N 103°50′56.87″E	
68	Robinson 77	Distant ground-level view of a 40-story building with a blue glass facade; the building has a rectangular cross-section and a diagonal roofline.	176	577	40	1998	1°16′40.2″N 103°50′53.62″E	
69=	The Concourse	Ground-level view of a building with an octagonal cross-section; the facade is white with dark, receded windows that appear to be continuous ridges from a distance	175	574	43	1995	1°18′03.8″N 103°51′43.8″E	
69=	Maybank Tower	Ground-level view of two 40-storey towers. The building on the left is very thin with a blue and grey facade. The building on the right has a square cross section with diagonal, cut-off corners and a tapering roofline.	175	574	32	2001	1°17′9.37″N 103°51′8.53″E	
71=	Six Battery Road	Ground-level view of three 40-storey towers. The building on the left is very thin with a blue and grey facade. The building in the center has a square cross section with diagonal, cut-off corners and a tapering roofline. The building on the right is box-like with diagonal corners and a brown facade.	174	571	44	1984	1°17′7.9″N 103°51′6.74″E	Also known as Standard Chartered Bank
71=	Oxley Tower	–	174	571	33	2017		
73	Samsung Hub	Ground-level view of a 30-storey building with protruding ledges, a spire, and a glass facade on the uppermost floors.	172	564	30	2005	1°16′59.76″N 103°50′58.7″E	
74	Lumiere	–	170	558	45	2010		
75	Bank of China Building	Ground-level view of a 40-storey white building with a square podium and star-shaped cross section	168	551	36	2000	1°17′8.71″N 103°51′7.47″E	
76	Springleaf Tower	40-storey building with a triangular cross section and rounded corner	165	541	37	2002	1°16′31.06″N 103°50′46.85″E	
77=	The Pinnacle@Duxton Block 1C		163	535	51	2009	1°16′36″N 103°50′29″E	World's tallest public residential building
77=	Icon Loft Tower 2	Ground-level view of a box-like, 50-storey tower with a rectangular cross section and a blue stripe on the lateral siding	163	535	46	2007	1°16′31.1″N 103°50′42.91″E	
77=	One Marina Boulevard		163	535	32	2004		
77=	Boulevard View	-	163	535	33	2014		
81=	Sky Everton		162	530	36	2023		
81=	United Overseas Bank Plaza Two	Ground-level view of a 40-storey skyscraper with an octagonal cross section and a protruding, triangular ledge near the 20th floor	162	531	38	1974	1°17′08″N 103°50′59″E	The extension and renovation of the building, which was completed in 1993, included the addition of 8 new floors
81=	Skyline @ Orchard Boulevard	-	162	531	33	2016		
81=	The Landmark @ Chin Swee Road	-	162	531	39	2025		
85=	Commonwealth Tower A	–	161	528	43	2017		Estimated height
85=	Commonwealth Tower B	–	161	528	43	2017		Estimated height
87=	Irwell Hill Residences Tower 1		160	525	36	2024		
87=	Irwell Hill Residences Tower 2		160	525	36	2024		
87=	Robinson Suites	–	160	525	42	2015		
87=	New Futura North Tower	-	160	525	36	2017		
87=	New Futura South Tower	-	160	525	36	2017		
87=	The Pinnacle@Duxton Block 1A		160	524	50	2009	1°16′36″N 103°50′29″E	Public residential building
87=	The Pinnacle@Duxton Block 1B		160	524	50	2009	1°16′36″N 103°50′29″E	Public residential building
87=	The Pinnacle@Duxton Block 1D		160	524	50	2009	1°16′36″N 103°50′29″E	Public residential building
87=	The Pinnacle@Duxton Block 1E		160	524	50	2009	1°16′36″N 103°50′29″E	Public residential building
87=	The Pinnacle@Duxton Block 1F		160	524	50	2009	1°16′36″N 103°50′29″E	Public residential building
87=	The Pinnacle@Duxton Block 1G		160	524	50	2009	1°16′36″N 103°50′29″E	Public residential building
98	Scotts Square Scotts Wing	-	159	523	42	2015		
99=	Hong Leong Finance Building	Ground-level view of a 45-storey, box-like building with a square cross section	158	518	45	1976	1°16′52.61″N 103°51′3.11″E	
99=	Raffles City Tower	Ground-level view of the three skyscrapers, each successively taller from left to right. The towers have white facades with dark windows and a rectangular cross-section, and the building farthest to the right is the most prominent.	158	518	42	1986	1°17′37″N 103°51′11″E	
99=	Centennial Tower	Ground-level view of a 40-storey skyscraper with a rounded facade and an open, lattice-work structure on the roof	158	518	37	1997	1°17′36.32″N 103°51′36.55″E	
99=	76 Shenton	-	158	518	40	2014		
99=	SkyOasis @ Dawson Block 39A	-	158	518	45	2020		Estimated height; public residential building
99=	SkyOasis @ Dawson Block 40A	-	158	518	45	2020		Estimated height; public residential building
99=	SkyOasis @ Dawson Block 42A	-	158	518	45	2020		Estimated height; public residential building
99=	SkyOasis @ Dawson Block 43A	-	158	518	45	2020		Estimated height; public residential building
99=	SkyResidence @ Dawson Block 30	-	158	518	45	2020		Estimated height; public residential building
99=	SkyResidence @ Dawson Block 32	-	158	518	45	2020		Estimated height; public residential building
99=	SkyResidence @ Dawson Block 33	-	158	518	45	2020		Estimated height; public residential building
99=	SkyResidence @ Dawson Block 34	-	158	518	45	2020		Estimated height; public residential building
99=	SkyResidence @ Dawson Block 36	-	158	518	45	2020		Estimated height; public residential building
99=	SkyResidence @ Dawson Block 37	-	158	518	45	2020		Estimated height; public residential building
113	Straits Trading Building	-	157	515	29	2010		
114=	Mapletree Business City II	-	155	510	30	2016		
114=	Echelon Tower 1	-	155	509	42	2016		
114=	Echelon Tower 2	-	155	509	42	2016		
114=	Ascentia Sky	-	155	507	45	2014		
118=	Nouvel 18 Tower A	-	154	505	36	2014		
118=	Nouvel 18 Tower B	-	154	505	36	2014		
118=	Spottiswoode Suites	-	154	505	36	2017		
118=	Artra	-	154	505	44	2021		
118=	One Holland Village Residences		154	505	33	2024		
123=	One Bernam		153	501	40	2025		
123=	One George Street	Ground-level view of a 20-storey skyscraper with a brown façade; the building has a rectangular cross section and is cut-off roughly 10 stories up, with the uppermost 10 floors partially protruding out over the street below.	153	502	23	2004	1°17′8.79″N 103°50′51.75″E	
123=	Scotts Tower	-	153	502	31	2017		
123=	Margaret Ville	-	153	502	40	2021		
123=	Riviere Tower 1		153	501	36	2023		
123=	Riviere Tower 2		153	501	36	2023		
123=	TwentyOne Anguilla Park	-	153	502	36	2014		
130=	Hilton Singapore Orchard Tower Two	Ground-level view of two concrete towers; the one on the left is more prominent, and has a windowless anterior facade with triangular structures protruding from the roof.	152	499	40	1973	1°18′07.6″N 103°50′10.0″E	Formerly The Mandarin Singapore
130=	30 Raffles Place	Ground-level view of a narrow, 30-storey skyscraper with a rectangular cross section and rounded anterior siding; a protruding circular spire is visible on the roof.	152	499	33	1993	1°17′3.81″N 103°51′6.64″E	
130=	Klimt Cairnhill		152	498	36	2025		
133=	The Clift, Singapore	-	151	495	43	2010		Estimated height
133=	SkyParc @ Dawson Block 94	-	151	495	43	2019		Estimated height; public residential building
133=	SkyParc @ Dawson Block 96	-	151	495	43	2019		Estimated height; public residential building
136=	The Gateway East	Ground-level view of a sharp, narrow corner on a building with a striped metal and glass facade	150	492	37	1990	1°17′55.71″N 103°51′32.15″E	
136=	The Gateway West	Ground-level view of a sharp, narrow corner on a building with a striped metal and glass facade	150	492	37	1990	1°17′55.71″N 103°51′32.15″E	
136=	Lippo Centre	Ground-level view of a 30-storey, box-like structure with a square cross section. The corner is windowless and slightly receded from the rest of the structure.	150	492	34	1990	1°16′23.03″N 103°50′40.38″E	
136=	OUE Downtown Tower Two		150	492	36	1994	1°16′37.40″N 103°50′54.06″E	Formerly DBS Building Tower Two
136=	Concourse Skyline	-	150	492	40	2010		
136=	Sculptura Ardmore	-	150	492	35	2015		

== Under construction ==
This lists buildings that are und4er construction in Singapore. A floor count of 40 stories is used as the cutoff for buildings whose heights have not yet been released by their developers.

Name	Height (m)	Height (ft)	Floors	Year (est.)	Status	Notes and references
Skywaters Residences	305	1,001	63	2028		Singapore's first supertall.
HPL Orchard	TBA	TBA	64	TBA		
W Residences Marina View	243	797	51	2028		
Promenade Peak	240	787	63	2029		
Zyon Grand	240	787	62	2029		
Marina Bay Sands Tower 4	244	802	55	2029		
Newport Tower	222	728	45	2027		
Clifford Centre Redevelopment	219	798	33	2028		
Shenton House Redevelopment	211	692	35	TBA		
Pearl's Hill	196	642	60	TBA		Singapore's tallest public housing project when completed.
Tanglin Shopping Centre Redevelopment	190	623	30	2030		
Marina Square Residential tower	190	623	49	2031		
HarbourFront Centre Redevelopment	187	613	33	2031		
Sky Tower (Sky Plaza)	164	538	30	2027		
Skye at Holland	164	538	40	2029		
UpperHouse at Orchard Boulevard	164	538	35	2029		
Aurea	164	538	45	2029		
Pernith	164	538	40	2029		
One Marina Gardens	163	534	45	2029		
Alexandra Vale Tower 1	163	534	50	2028		
Alexandra Vale Tower 2	163	534	50	2028		
Redhill Peaks	163	534	49	2031		
Bukit Merah Ridge	163	534	48	2028		
Stirling Horizon	160	525	47	2030		
Ulu Pandan Vista	160	525	45	2029		
Ulu Pandan Banks	160	525	44	2029		
Tanglin Halt Courtyard	159	523	48	2029		
Ulu Pandan Glades	154	505	43	2029		
Queensway Canopy	153	501	40	2028		
Queen's Arc	153	501	39	2027		
Havelock Hillside	152	500	45	2028		
King George's Heights	151	495	47	2027		
J'Den	150	492	40	2028		
Jurong East Integrated Transport Hub	150	492	27	2027		
Mount Pleasant Crest	150	492	46	2031		

*Table entries without text indicate that information regarding them has not yet been released.

== Timeline of tallest buildings ==
This lists commercial buildings that once held the title of tallest building in Singapore. As of 2016, the title of tallest building in Singapore is held by Guoco Tower.

Name	Image	Street address	Years as tallest	Height (m)	Height (ft)	Floors	Coordinates	Notes
Cathay Building^{[C]}	Rounded building with two visibile facades; the lower floors have a concrete exterior with grooved, triangular niches and round, protruding edges. The uppermost floors, slightly less prominent, have a glass exterior.	2 Handy Road	1939–1954	70	230	17	1°17′57.5″N 103°50′51.5″E	Demolished in 2003
Asia Insurance Building	Beige rectangular building, 20 storeys and at 87 metres tall, with newer taller skyscrapers seen in the background.	2 Finlayson Green	1954–1971	87	285	20	1°16′55″N 103°51′05″E	
The Mandarin Singapore Tower One	Ground-level view of two concrete towers; the one on the right is more prominent, and has a windowless lateral facade with triangular structures protruding from the roof.	333 Orchard Road	1971–1973	144	472	36	1°18′07.6″N 103°50′10.0″E	
The Mandarin Singapore Tower Two^{[A]}	Ground-level view of two concrete towers; the one on the right is more prominent, and has a windowless lateral facade with triangular structures protruding from the roof.	333 Orchard Road	1973–1975	152	499	40	1°18′07.6″N 103°50′10.0″E	
UIC Building^{[A]}^{[C]}	40-storey box-like structure seen from Shenton Way.	5 Shenton Way	1973–1975	152	499	40	1°16′40.51″N 103°50′58.49″E	Demolished in 2013
DBS Building Tower One	Distant view of a box-like building with many black ridges; a similar-looking building is located directly behind it.	6 Shenton Way	1975–1986	201	659	50	1°16′37.40″N 103°50′54.06″E	
OUB Centre^{[B]}	Ground-level view of 60-storey building whose cross section is a square with a diagonal projection from one corner. In the top 10 storeys part of the square is missing and only a diagonal remains.	1 Raffles Place	1986–2016	280	919	63	1°17′04.89″N 103°51′03.70″E	
UOB Plaza One^{[B]}	Ground-level view of several skyscrapers; the building on the right is the tallest and has a square cross section with several diagonal protrusions. A shorter building on the left resembles it closely.	80 Raffles Place	1992–2016	280	919	62	1°17′08″N 103°50′59″E	
Republic Plaza^{[B]}	Ground-level view of 70-storey building. The exterior has a reddish hue with dark windows. The building tapers slightly at two points.	9 Raffles Place	1995–2016	280	919	66	1°16′58″N 103°51′04″E	
Guoco Tower		Choon Guan Street	2016–present	290	950	65	1°16′37.560″N 103°50′45.960″E	

== See also ==
- Future developments in Singapore
- List of tallest buildings in Southeast Asia
- List of tallest structures by country

== Notes ==
A. ^ ^{a} ^{b} The UIC Building, completed in 1973, tied the height of Meritus Mandarin Singapore Tower Two. The city therefore had two tallest buildings until the completion of the United Overseas Bank Plaza Two in 1974.
B. ^ ^{a} ^{b} ^{c} The United Overseas Bank Plaza One, completed in 1992, tied the height of the Overseas Union Bank Centre. The city therefore had two tallest buildings until the completion of Republic Plaza in 1995, which also tied the height of the two older structures. From 1995 to 2016, Singapore had three tallest buildings until Guoco Tower was completed.
C. ^ ^{a} The building has since been demolished.
