= CapitaLand =

Singaporean real estate organisation

CapitaLand Group Pte. Ltd.

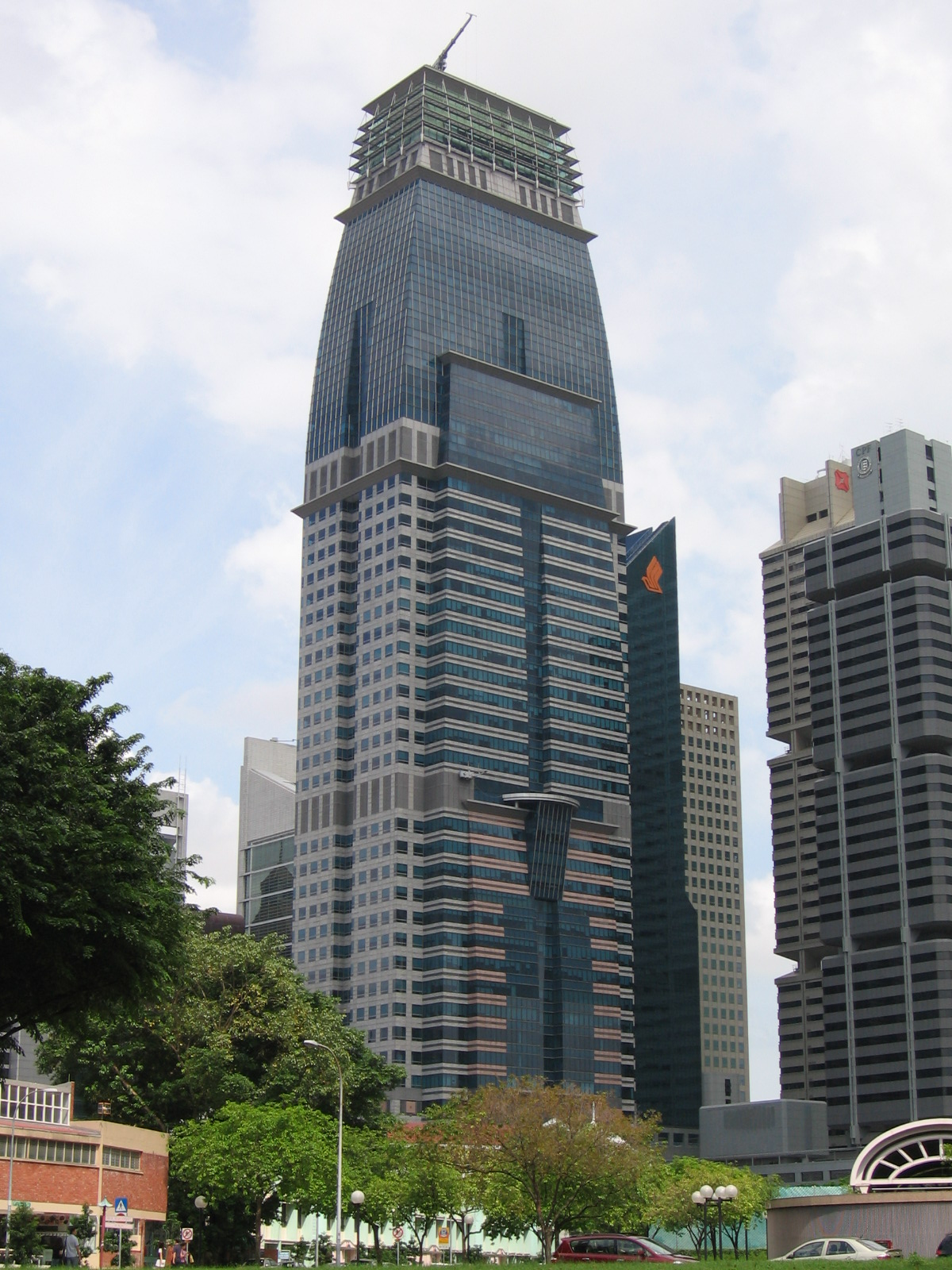
- Capital Tower, flagship building and headquarters of CapitaLand
- Type: Public
- Traded as: SGX: 9CI (CapitaLand Investment Ltd); SGX: C38U (CapitaLand Integrated Commercial Trust); SGX: HMN (CapitaLand Ascott Trust)
- Industry: Real estate investment management and real estate development
- Predecessors: DBS Land; Pidemco Land
- Founded: 28 November 2000; 25 years ago
- Headquarters: Singapore
- Key people: Wong Kan Seng (Chairperson); Miguel Ko (chairman, CapitaLand Investment); Lee Chee Koon (Group CEO, CapitaLand Investment)
- Revenue: ▼S$30.19 billion (2011)
- Operating income: ▼S$20.8 billion (2011)
- Net income: ▼S$12.1 billion (2011)
- AUM: S$603 billion (2011)
- Number of employees: 11,500
- Parent: Temasek Holdings
- Subsidiaries: CapitaLand Investment; CapitaLand Development; CapitaLand Integrated Commercial Trust; CapitaLand Ascendas REIT; CapitaLand Ascott Trust; CapitaLand China Trust; CapitaLand India Trust; CapitaLand Malaysia Trust
- Website: www.capitaland.com

CapitaLand Group Pte. Ltd. (CapitaLand) headquartered in Singapore, is one of Asia’s largest diversified real estate groups. CapitaLand operates in over 270 cities across more than 40 countries. Its portfolio focuses on real asset management, real estate development and operating capabilities through its listed real asset management business CapitaLand Investment and its privately held property development arm CapitaLand Development.

CapitaLand Group is a wholly owned subsidiary of Temasek Holdings.

== History ==
=== Formation and early years (2000-2005) ===
On 21 November 2000, CapitaLand listed on the Singapore Exchange following the merger of Pidemco Land and DBS Land, creating one of Asia’s largest listed property companies with total assets of approximately S$18 billion.

CapitaLand listed CapitaMall Trust, Singapore's first real estate investment trust (REIT), on 17 July 2002. This was followed by the listing of CapitaCommercial Trust, Singapore’s first commercial REIT, in May 2004.

CapitaLand established its China office in 2001 and opened Raffles City Shanghai in 2004. Raffles City Shanghai was one of the largest property investments undertaken by a Singapore consortium, amounting to US$350 million (RMB2.9 billion). Raffles City, CapitaLand’s integrated development concept, originated in Singapore with the opening of Raffles City Singapore in 1986 by DBS.

In 2002, CapitaLand’s serviced residence arm, The Ascott Limited, acquired a 50% interest in Citadines, a pan-European serviced residence chain. Ascott completed the acquisition of Citadines in 2004, expanding Ascott’s European footprint.

In 2005, CapitaLand established its philanthropic arm, CapitaLand Hope Foundation. The Foundation focuses on building resilience in the communities where it operates through educational, healthcare and well-being support for vulnerable children, youth and seniors.

=== International expansion (2006-2015) ===
CapitaLand expanded its REIT platform with the listing of Ascott Residence Trust and CapitaRetail China Trust in Singapore in 2006. This was followed by the listing of CapitaMalls Malaysia Trust in Malaysia in 2010.

CapitaLand opened Raffles City developments in Beijing in 2009, Chengdu in 2012 and Ningbo in 2012. It also opened ION Orchard in 2009 and CapitaGreen in 2015 in Singapore.

In 2013, CapitaLand completed The Interlace, a 1,040-unit condominium in Singapore. The Interlace was recognised as the ‘World Building of the Year’ at the 2015 World Architecture Festival.

In 2015, CapitaLand renamed three of its REITs under a unified CapitaLand brand. CapitaCommercial Trust became CapitaLand Commercial Trust, CapitaMall Trust became CapitaLand Mall Trust and CapitaRetail China Trust became CapitaLand Retail China Trust.

In the same year, CapitaLand established the Ascott Global Serviced Residence Fund, which acquired two assets in Paris and Tokyo.

=== Transformation (2016–2020) ===
In 2019, CapitaLand acquired Ascendas-Singbridge in an S$11 billion deal, forming one of Asia’s largest diversified real estate groups. The acquisition expanded CapitaLand’s portfolio in business parks, logistics and industrial properties, and urban development. Ascendas REIT and Ascendas India Trust also became part of CapitaLand.

Following the acquisition, Ascott Residence Trust and Ascendas Hospitality Trust merged, creating Asia Pacific’s largest hospitality trust with S$7.6 billion in combined assets.

CapitaLand properties completed in 2019 included Jewel Changi Airport.

In 2020, CapitaLand Mall Trust and CapitaLand Commercial Trust merged to form CapitaLand Integrated Commercial Trust, the largest Singapore REIT at the time and one of Asia Pacific’s largest REITs with a portfolio value of S$22.4 billion.

=== Notable Projects ===
==== Lodging ====
The Ascott Limited, a wholly owned subsidiary of CapitaLand, was established in 1984 with the opening of The Ascott Singapore. It operates serviced residence properties in more than 220 cities across over 40 countries worldwide.

==== Data Centres ====
CapitaLand also owns a data centre in Ambattur area of Chennai, developed through its listed fund platform, CapitaLand India Trust (CLINT). The AI-ready facility is designed to have 34 MW of IT power capacity across 13 data halls, supported by 110 kV substation.

== Alleged bribery claims ==
In 2025, a civil lawsuit filed in Singapore alleged that senior employees linked to CapitaLand accepted bribes from a long-time contractor involved in its India projects. The case was brought by a Singapore construction company against a former director who oversaw its India investments.

CapitaLand was not a party to the lawsuit but was mentioned in court filings by both sides. The allegations had not been proven in court, and no findings of wrongdoing had been made at the time.
