= Shenton (disambiguation) =

Shenton is a village in Leicestershire.

Shenton may also refer to:

- Shenton (surname) includes list of people bearing the name

== Places ==
=== Australia ===
- Shenton Avenue, road in Perth
- Shenton College, college in Perth
- Shenton House, building in University of Western Australia
- Shenton Park, Western Australia, suburb of Perth

=== Singapore ===
- 8 Shenton Way, skyscraper
- One Shenton Way, skyscraper
- Shenton Way, road
- Shenton Way MRT station, Mass Rapid Transit station

== See also ==
- Old Mill, Perth, aka Shenton's Mill
