= Prince Edward Road =

Prince Edward Road may refer to:

- Prince Edward Road (Singapore), a road located within the Shenton Way district, Singapore
  - Prince Edward Road MRT station, a train station in Singapore
- Prince Edward Road (Hong Kong), a road network in Kowloon, Hong Kong
  - Prince Edward Road East
  - Prince Edward Road West
    - Prince Edward station, a train station in Hong Kong
