= Skywaters Residences =

Mixed-use skyscraper in Singapore

- Artist's impression of Skywaters Residences
- Interactive map of the Skywaters Residences area

General information
- Status: Under construction
- Type: Mixed-use
- Location: Downtown Core, Singapore, 8 Shenton Way, Singapore 068811
- Coordinates: 1.2758°N 103.8472°E
- Construction started: 2023
- Estimated completion: 2028
- Cost: S$3 billion

Height
- Roof: 1,001 ft (305 m)

Technical details
- Floor count: 63
- Grounds: 10,983 square metres (118,220 sq ft)

Design and construction
- Architects: Skidmore, Owings & Merrill; DCA Architects
- Developer: Perennial Holdings; Alibaba Singapore

Other information
- Number of units: 215 (Residenatial)
- Number of suites: 11 (Hotel)

Website
- https://www.skywatersresidences.com.sg/

Skywaters Residences is a 63-storey mixed-use supertall skyscraper currently under construction in the Downtown Core district of Singapore. Upon its completion in 2028, the 305 m (1,001 ft) tower will surpass Guoco Tower to become the tallest building in Singapore and the first in the country to qualify as a supertall. The development will include office spaces, retail outlets, residential units and a hotel.

== Background ==
Jointly developed by Singapore's Perennial Holdings and Alibaba, the skyscraper stands on the site of the former AXA Tower, which became the tallest building to ever be voluntarily demolished. The redevelopment of the AXA Towers were first announced on 7 July 2022, when redevelopment plans for a new 63-storey building with a height of 1,001 feet (305 metres) were approved by the Urban Redevelopment Authority for a consortium consisting of Alibaba, Perennial Holdings, and local partners. This marked the new building as the tallest skyscraper ever approved to be constructed in Singapore. The mixed-use building will be mostly made up of office, hotel, and residential spaces, with an observation level and some retail space. It is planned to be completed by 2028.

== Construction and design ==
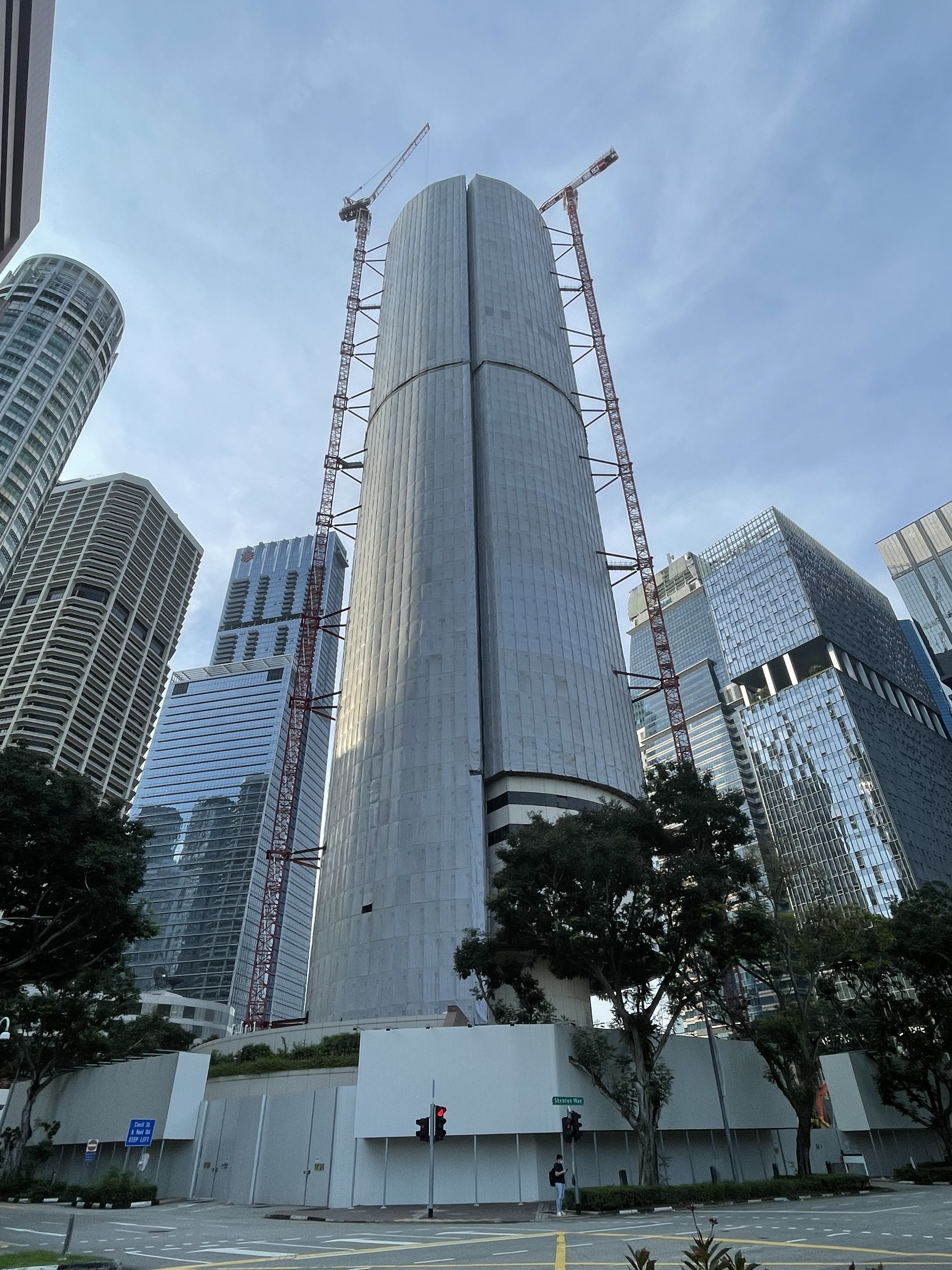
AXA Tower in September 2022, after it was closed to the public and preparations for demolition had begun.

In May 2022, AXA Tower was closed and demolition began shortly after. The new building will retain the AXA tower's foundation, to reduce materials used in the construction and to reduce environmental impact during redevelopment. A S$3 billion real estate green loan was secured by Perennial Holdings and its partners in November 2022 for the development of the site, with sustainability construction being incorporated into the design and development of the new building.

Designed by Skidmore, Owings & Merrill and Singapore's DCA Architects, the building will feature 148,000 square metres (1,590,000 sq ft) of floor space, with 3 storeys of retail spaces, 19 storeys of offices, 3 storeys of hotel suites and 36 storeys of residential units. The building will also feature 10,000 square metres (110,000 sq ft) of green spaces, as well as a rainwater irrigation system for plants located within the green spaces.

== See also ==
- List of tallest buildings in Singapore
- List of buildings
