= Prince Edward Road (Singapore) =

Road in Shenton Way, Singapore

Route information
- Existed: 1920s–present
- History: Named after the Prince of Wales (later Edward VIII)

Major junctions
- Northwest end: Shenton Way, Anson Road
- Southeast end: Marina View

Prince Edward Road is a road located within the Shenton Way district in the Central Area of Singapore. It was named in honor of the 1922 visit by the Prince of Wales (later Edward VIII) for the Malaya–Borneo Exhibition.

== History ==
Prince Edward Road was officially named in the early 20th century following the visit of the Prince of Wales to Singapore in 1922 for the Malaya–Borneo Exhibition. Historically, the road was situated near the original coastline before extensive land reclamation projects shifted the shore further south toward the Marina South area.

In 1958, the road became the site of the first campus of Singapore Polytechnic (SP). The campus, which cost S$5.2 million to construct, was officially opened by Prince Philip, Duke of Edinburgh, in 1959. The polytechnic remained at this location until 1978, when it relocated to its current campus in Dover to accommodate a growing student population. The former SP buildings were subsequently renamed the Bestway Building and served various tenancies, including the headquarters of Mediacorp TV12 in the 1990s.

== Landmarks ==
- MAS Building: Located at the junction of Prince Edward Road and Shenton Way, this 30-story building serves as the headquarters for the Monetary Authority of Singapore (MAS). Completed in 1985.
- Springleaf Tower: A mixed-use development that flanks Prince Edward Road and Parsi Road. It was completed in 2002 and houses a mix of commercial offices and serviced apartments.
- Bestway Building: The site of the original Singapore Polytechnic. The building was vacated in 2017 and conserved due to its historical significance, despite its proximity to the construction of the Prince Edward Road station.

== Transport ==
=== Prince Edward Road MRT station ===
The Prince Edward Road MRT station is an underground station on the Circle Line that opened in 2026.

=== Shenton Way Bus Terminal ===
The Shenton Way Bus Terminal was originally located under the East Coast Parkway (ECP)'s viaduct before being relocated to Palmer Road and subsequently back to its current site along Shenton Way in 2017. This relocation was necessary to make way for the deep excavation works required for the Prince Edward Road MRT station. The terminal serves as a major turnaround point for bus services entering the Central Area.
