= Singapore Conference Hall =

Multi-purpose building in Singapore

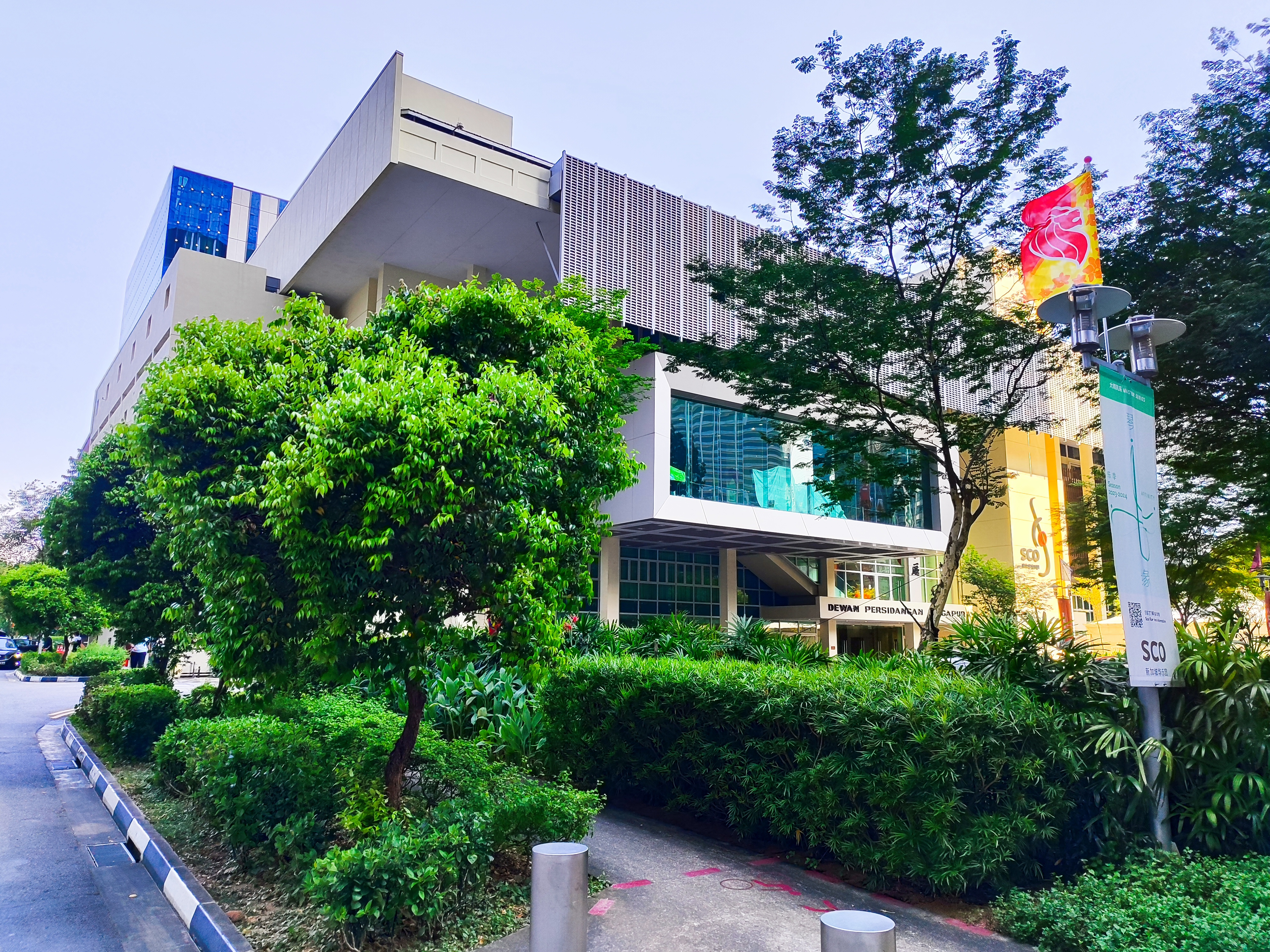
- Exterior of the Singapore Conference Hall
- Former names: Dewan Persidangan Singapura dan Rumah Kesatuan Sekerja (Malay)

General information
- Status: Completed
- Architectural style: Modernist architecture
- Location: Shenton Way, Downtown Core, Singapore, 7 Shenton Way, Singapore 068810
- Coordinates: 1.276208°N 103.848943°E
- Groundbreaking: 8 August 1962; 64 years ago
- Completed: September 1965; 61 years ago
- Opening: 15 October 1965; 61 years ago

Technical details
- Floor count: 5

Design and construction
- Designations: National monument

National monument of Singapore
- Designated: 27 December 2010; 15 years ago
- Reference no.: 62

The Singapore Conference Hall (abbreviation: SCH), formerly the Singapore Conference Hall and Trade Union House, is a multipurpose building in Shenton Way, Singapore. Designed in modernist style, the SCH is five stories tall and capped with a cantilevered V-shaped roof. The SCH houses the Singapore Chinese Orchestra (SCO); the concert hall has a capacity of 831 people. It was the first post-colonial building to be gazetted as a national monument in Singapore.

The SCH was initially constructed to house the various trade unions in Singapore as part of a 1959 election promise by the People's Action Party. The building design by the Malayan Architects Co-Partnership was selected through a competition held by the government in 1962. Completed in October 1965, the SCH hosted various conferences and exhibitions in addition to being the headquarters of the National Trades Union Congress (NTUC).

After the NTUC expanded and moved out of the SCH, the building was renovated and repurposed to be the SCO's permanent home, and the SCH reopened in 2001. The SCH continues to host other events, including the state funeral for former deputy prime minister Goh Keng Swee in 2010. Another renovation took place in 2017, restoring two staircases demolished in the 2001 renovation, and the SCH reopened on 26 January 2018.

== Site ==
The building is situated at 7 Shenton Way, which is located near the junction with Straits Boulevard and Maxwell Road. It is adjacent to the Singapore Chinese Cultural Centre, and is near commercial developments such as OUE Downtown and V on Shenton. The land lot spans 3 acres (12,000 m^{2}), and the building measures 210 by 140 feet (64 by 43 m). At the entrance, a sign displays "Dewan Persidangan Singapura" – the Malay name of the building.

== Architecture ==
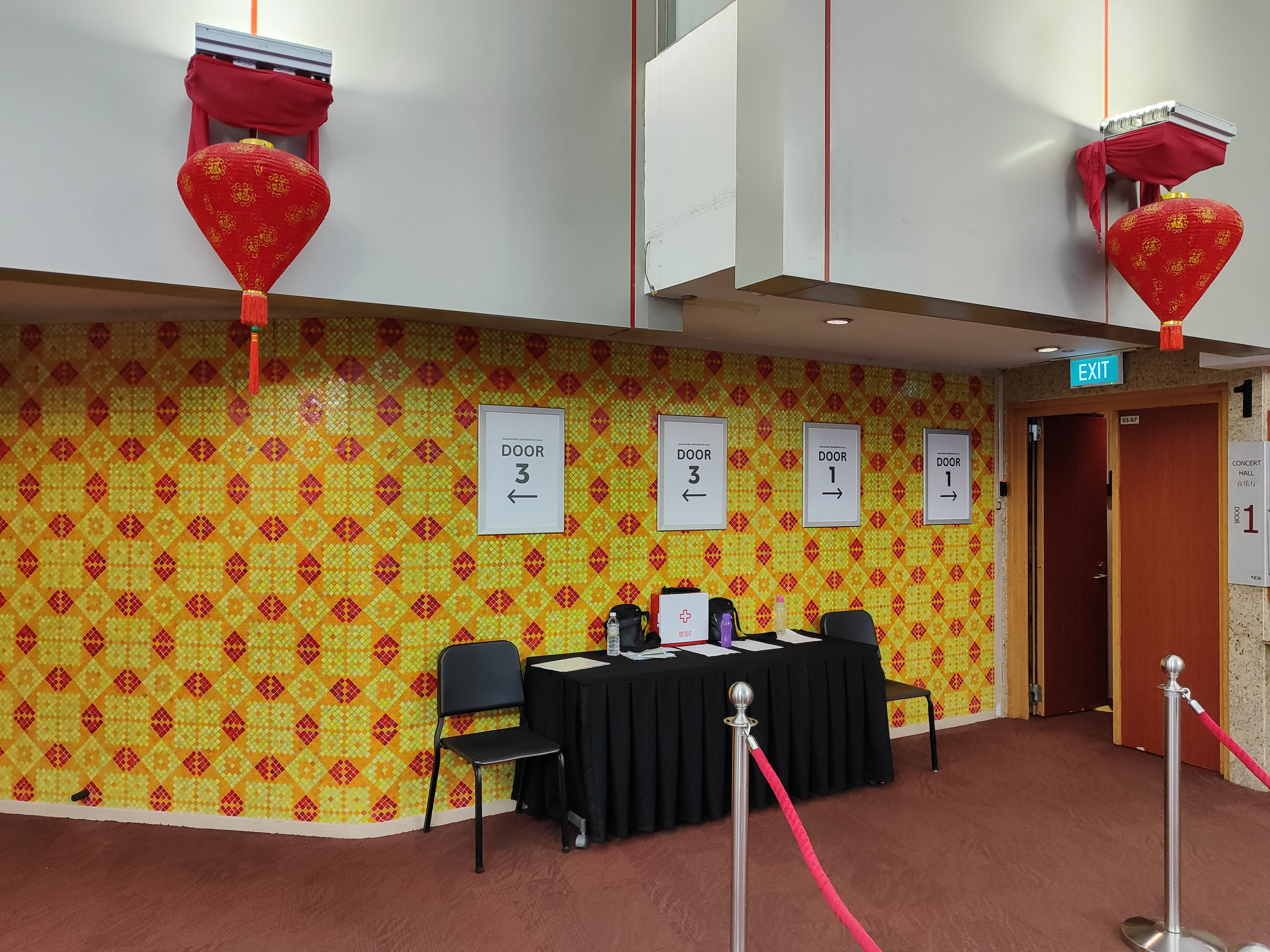
Mosaic tiles at the foyer outside the concert hall

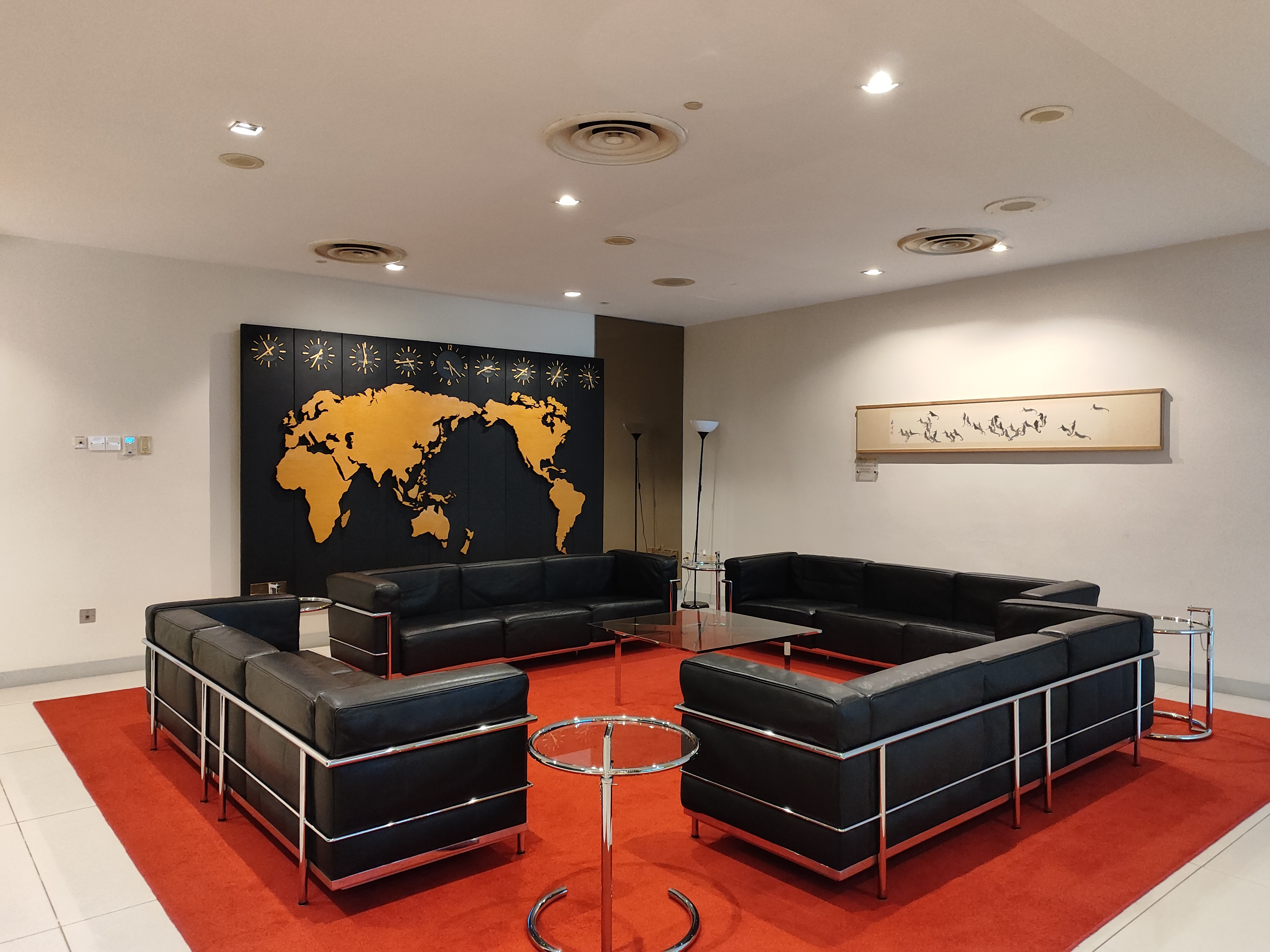
The VIP lounge

The building was designed in modernist style by three architects from the Malayan Architects Co-Partnership – Chan Voon Fee, William Lim, and Lim Chong Keat. The SCH is five stories tall and air-conditioned, with a natural ventilation system integrated into the building design due to Singapore's tropical climate. The building is capped with a cantilevered roof and terraces, which are supported by concrete columns. The V-shaped roof collects rainwater which drains through the central downpipe. The interior walls and ceilings are crafted from local timber such as merbau and mersawa, serving as an expression of local identity. The walls are also covered with mosaic tiles of Malay mat patterns, some retained from previous renovations. Provisions on the roof allowed for a penthouse and garden to be built.

When initially constructed, the building included administrative and secretarial rooms, meeting halls, canteens, a reception hall and a lounge. At the centre of the building is the concourse which serves as an assembly area, and can be used for hosting exhibitions or events held before or after the concert. The atrium was naturally ventilated until it was enclosed and air-conditioned following the 2001 renovation. The reception rooms were located on the ground and first floors (later renumbered the first and second stories), while rooms on the other floors were used by the National Trades Union Congress (NTUC). The second and third floors had 12 offices each, with the NTUC secretariat office on the fourth floor. Four committee rooms and a central meeting room were on the top floor.

The building now includes a resource library, a score library, an exhibition hall, a Sistic ticket office, three backstage practice halls and 15 studios. A music school and a preschool are also housed in the SCH. Most of the facilities, excluding the libraries, are available for rent by the public, allowing the Singapore Chinese Orchestra (SCO) to generate income for its operations. The exhibition hall at the lower ground, which can be used for meetings, presentations, launches, rehearsals, exhibitions and ensemble performances, has a maximum capacity of 150 people and can be partitioned into three rooms. The three practice halls can be combined and accommodate up to 100 people. A VIP lounge is directly linked to the concert hall via a lift.

=== Concert hall ===
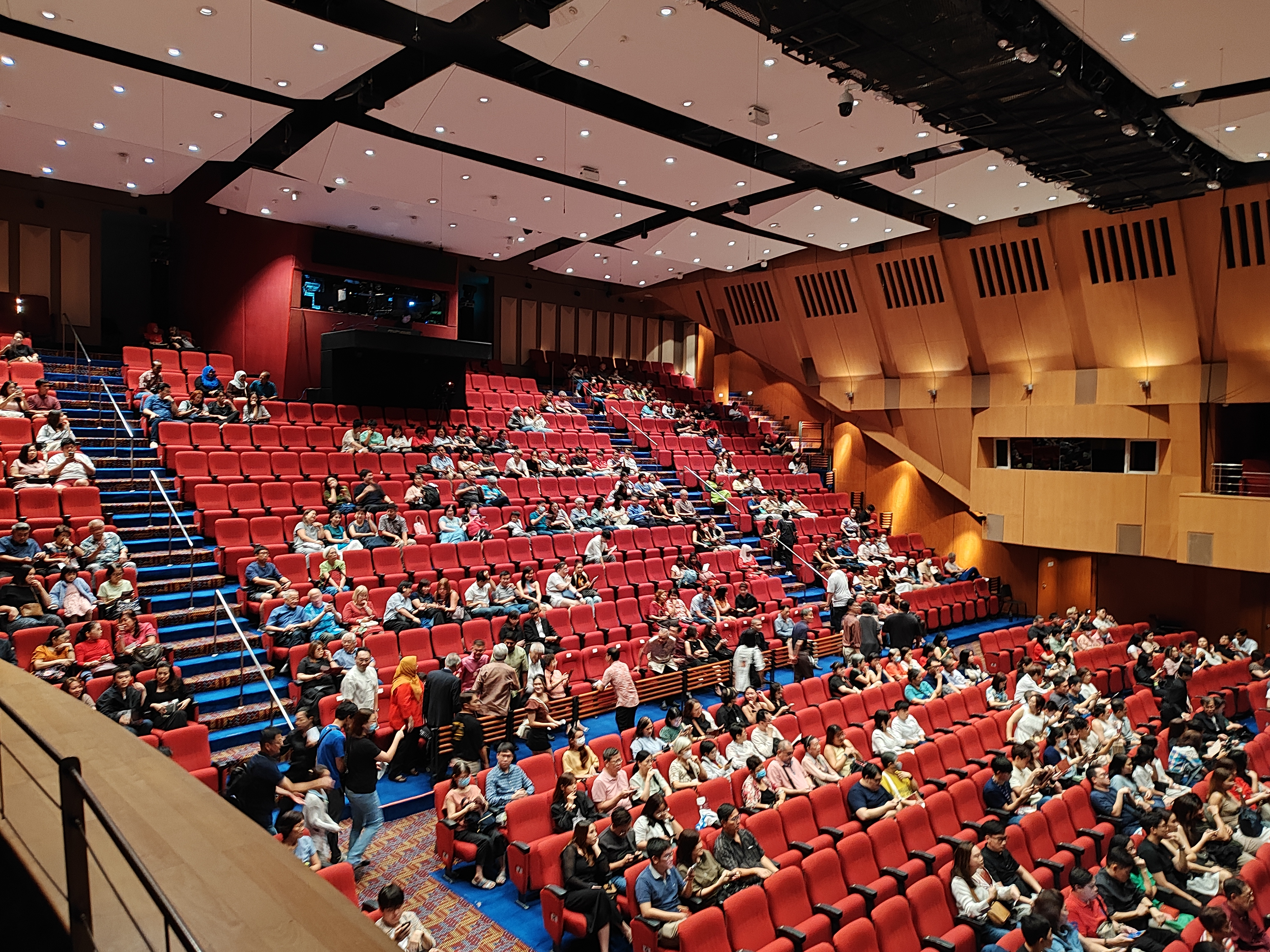
Concert hall

The original auditorium, located on the second floor (renumbered third floor), had a maximum capacity of 1000 people, and the seats and the stage could be rearranged in three configurations for conference and concert purposes. The auditorium has a sloped raked section and a flat section. The U-shaped configuration could seat 265 people on the flat floor, 492 people on the sloped section, and 50 people on the stage. During plenary sessions when the speakers were mainly on the stage, the flat floor could accommodate 465 people. During concerts, the flat floor could seat 530 people, with space available for standees and two VIP boxes.

A public address system and tape recording facilities were installed in the auditorium, with the sound control room adjacent to the projection room at the back on the third floor (renumbered fourth floor). The 70 microphones and 600 wireless receivers could be flexibly rearranged for simultaneous translation services. Translator booths to control the six-channel translation services were on the left of the Hall, while rooms for radio and TV commentators were on the right. A lighting gallery was on the top floor.

The doors of the auditorium are sound-proof. The current concert hall has a capacity of 831 people – 333 stall seats, 462 circle seats and 18 seats in each of the two galleries. There were previously 869 seats, but some had to be removed for an expanded stage during the 2017 renovation. The stage measures 17.41 by 11.41 metres (57.1 by 37.4 ft). Two staircases, which were demolished in the 2000 renovation, were reinstated with two link bridges to allow direct life access to the concert hall for wheelchair-users.

While the original auditorium was not designed for theatrical performances, the loudspeakers were specially positioned so its acoustics were on par with other halls. The current acoustic system is by Meyer Sounds, addressing previous complaints about reverberation and deteriorating sound quality for seats at the back of the hall.

=== Reception ===
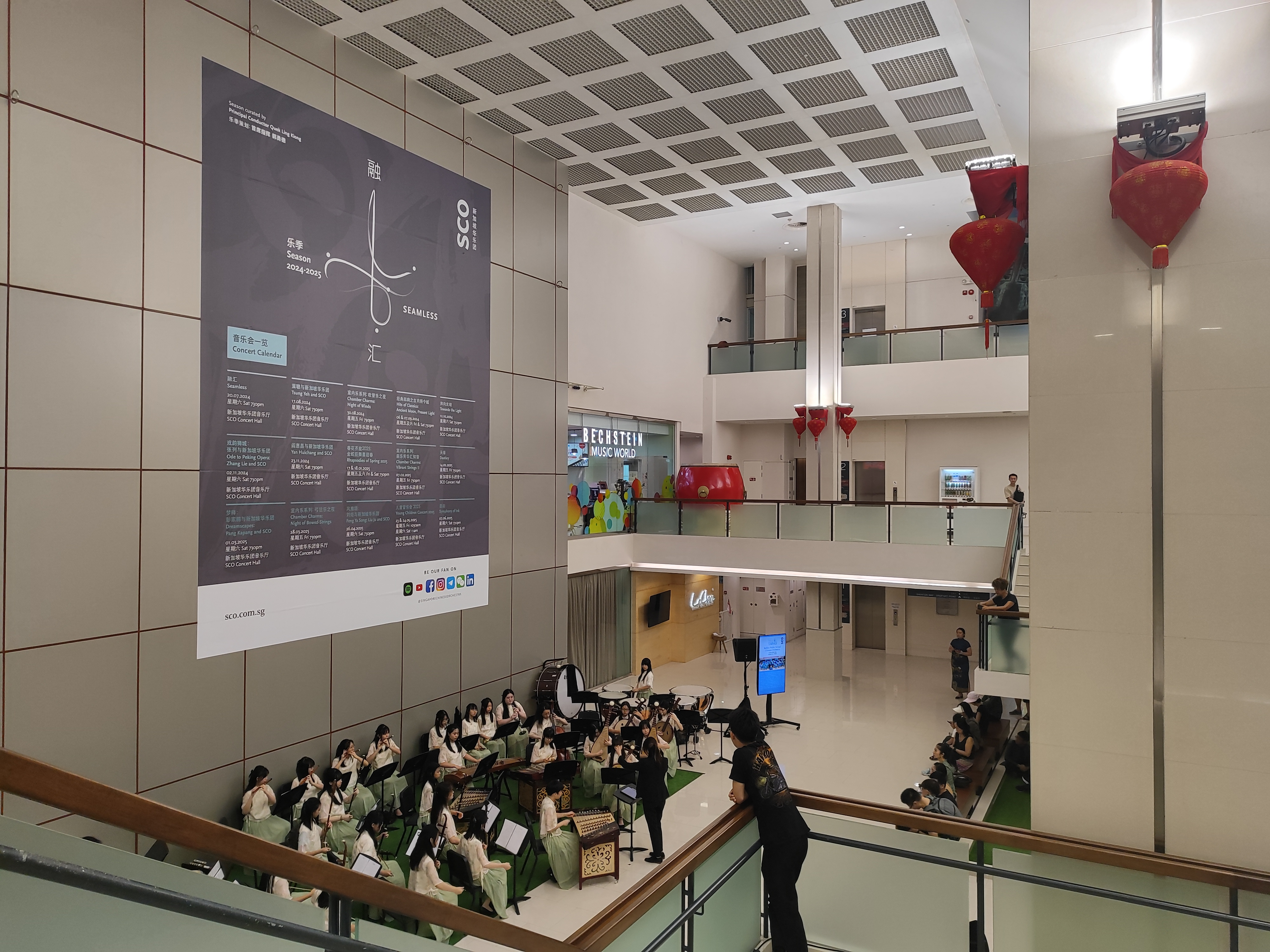
The concourse area of the building

Wee Chwee Heng of The Straits Budget praised the jury's "foresight and courage" in selecting the winning design in 1962. Wee called the building as a "showpiece" for the people to be proud of and a "fitting monument" for the trade unions with its dedication to socialist ideals. When inspecting the building model, Law Minister K. M. Byrne echoed that it would be a building Singapore could take pride in, and later stated his intentions for the building "to be a monument to the status and dignity of labour".

In 2011, when the SCH was designated as a national monument, John Lui of The Straits Times criticised the building as a "humdrum" and felt the "boxy structure" of the building had not aged well. While acknowledging that the SCH "stood majestically alone" in historical photos, Lui noted how the surrounding skyscrapers "put (the SCH) in the shade", and called for a proper restoration of the building. The original building architect Lim Chong Keat described the alterations as "violations" and felt he should have been consulted for the renovations. Sean Lim wrote in a 2017 commentary that the SCH "represented the hospitable face of the nation" as it hosted various foreign dignitaries such as Indian prime minister Indira Gandhi. Lim also commented that the building "evokes a wave of nostalgia" for many Singaporeans as plenty had attended various ceremonies or events held at the SCH.

== History ==
=== Trade Union House ===
External images
- Lim Chong Keat, one of the architects of the SCH, presenting the building model to labour minister Byrne Source: NAS
- Lee Kuan Yew greeting protestors at the official opening of the SCH Source: NAS
- The SCH in 1965 Source: NAS

As part of the People’s Action Party (PAP) five-year plan for Singapore during the 1959 general election, a trade union house was announced to unite the labour movement in Singapore. The Trade Union House would have a library and recreation facilities, modelled upon Britain's Trade Union House and union headquarters in other nations.

The former site of the Saint Andrew's School on Armenian Street was initially chosen in October 1960. In May 1961, Labour and Law Minister K. M. Byrne announced that the Trade Union House would be built on Shenton Way instead, with the plans already in the "well advanced stage". In addition to facilities for the trade unions, Byrne envisioned that the building would also host civic activities and international conferences. In June, the government held a design competition with leading architects Ng Keng Siang and Tio Seng Chi as the judges. Architects in Singapore and Malaya were invited to submit their proposals for the building, which was called to be "imposing in character". Among 16 submissions, the government selected the design by the Malayan Architects Co-Partnership in March 1962. The top three submissions received cash prizes.

The government's motion for a S$1.5 million fund for the S$4 million building was resisted by the opposition in December 1961. Inche Mohamed Alwi from the Alliance party questioned whether the Trade Union House would serve all trade unions or only those favored by the government. While Wee Toon Boon – Byrne's parliamentary secretary – said that the House would be open to all, he emphasized that it would not be used for pro-Communist activities. Lim Yew Hock from the Alliance called the house as a "sop" to appease workers and suggested unions could fund their own house. Lim argued against investing in a conference hall, believing international conferences would instead move to the Malaysian capital of Kuala Lumpur after the merger. Byrne asserted that Singapore would remain a significant international hub in Southeast Asia, justifying the facility's necessity.

Construction of the Trade Union House began on 9 August 1962 with the laying of a building's foundation stone by a low-ranking trade unionist. The ceremony was attended by Byrne, NTUC secretary Devan Nair, home affairs minister Ong Pang Boon and the president of the Industrial Arbitration Court Charles Gamba among other government leaders and trade unionists. The building structure was completed in July 1964, and the building was expected to be completed by the end of that year. However, due to the building's "complicated nature", the Ministry of National Development later announced that the conference hall would only be completed by February of the following year. The Trade Union House opened on 15 October 1965, with an inauguration ceremony by prime minister Lee Kuan Yew. Also in attendance were Nair, who was called by his supporters to remain in Singapore, NTUC members, trade unionists from other nations in Africa and Asia, and other government leaders. The Trade Union House and Singapore Conference Hall has hosted significant events, including state banquets for visiting Indian prime minister Indira Gandhi in 1968 and U.S. vice-president Spiro T. Agnew in 1970. The 1971 Commonwealth summit was also held at this venue – the first summit to be held outside of London. The SCH was the venue of the "Mr. Singapore" 1968 contest. A state banquet celebrating the 150th anniversary of Singapore's founding was also held on 8 August 1969 with Princess Alexandra in attendance. The NTUC also held its May Day rallies and delegates' conferences at the venue. Several government initiatives were launched at the SCH, including the "Keep Singapore Clean" campaign in 1968, the National Courtesy Campaign in June 1979, and the Speak Mandarin Campaign in September. The SCH was also the nomination centre for Singapore's first presidential election in 1993.

=== Singapore Chinese Orchestra ===
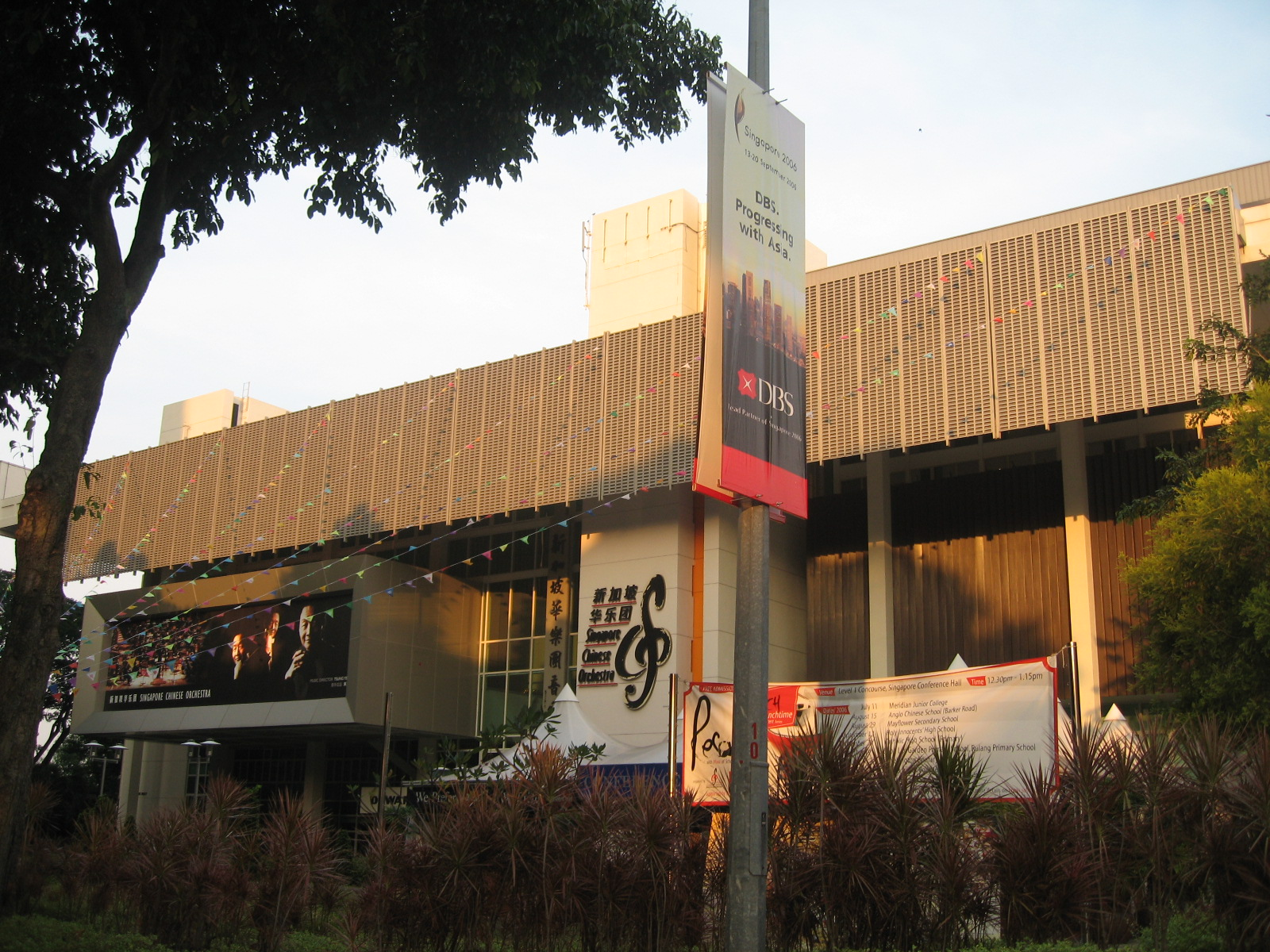
The Singapore Conference Hall in 2006

In a 1991 May Day speech, first deputy prime minister Goh Chok Tong announced that NTUC would move to a new location in Marina South as the Trade Union House was inadequate to accommodate the expanding NTUC. At that point, new and taller office buildings had surrounded the Trade Union House, which Goh considered to have "dwarfed" NTUC's national importance and contribution to Singapore's growth. In 1996, Goh announced that the government would provide NTUC a S$320 million grant for its new office building in Raffles Quay, which would also house the Singapore Labour Foundation, NTUC Income and other NTUC organisations.

At the inauguration of the Singapore Chinese Orchestra (SCO) Company on 24 June 1996, Lee Hsien Loong, deputy prime minister and the SCO's first patron, announced that the SCH would be renovated and repurposed to be SCO's permanent home. The renovation was expected to cost S$22 million, with the government providing an annual grant to the SCO for its operations and growth. As a result of the renovation, the 1997's observance of World Religion Day had to be held elsewhere.

Renovation works began in September 1999 and was completed in 2001 for only S$14.7 million. The SCO held its first concert at the SCH on 27 July that year, which was attended by 800 people. The pieces performed included Eulogising The General, Panoramic South, Fisherman's Story and Legend Of Narcissus. A subsequent concert on 22 September marked the official reopening of the SCH and the SCO's fifth anniversary, and was attended by Lee as its guest-of-honour. Several new local compositions were showcased, including The Festival Overture by Phoon Yew Tien.

The Preservation of Monuments Board (PMB) designated the SCH as a national monument on 27 December 2010; it was the first post-colonial building to be gazetted. The SCH was chosen as the PMB considered that "its history was closely intertwined with Singapore's path towards independence in 1965". A few interviewed by The Straits Times expressed confusion as the SCH was relatively unknown among the Singapore public. Heritage conservationists, however, felt the designation was too late. Lai Chee Kien, an assistant professor of architecture at the National University of Singapore, pointed out that the 1999 renovation "greatly changed" the SCH, especially with air conditioning installed and some of the mosaic tiles dismantled. When interviewed about the designation, Lim Chong Keat expressed "no reaction". Nevertheless, Ho Weng Hin from the Singapore Heritage Society felt the designation "was better late than never" and that it could indicate greater focus on preserving other modern buildings in Singapore.

The SCH continues to host other events besides SCO concerts. The state funeral for former deputy prime minister Goh Keng Swee was held at the SCH on 23 May 2010. The Purple Symphony – Singapore's first inclusive orchestra – debuted with its first concert at the SCH on 31 July 2015. Some public performances of the Singapore Youth Festival (SYF) were held at the SCH, especially for the band, guzheng and Chinese orchestra segments. Briefly suspended during the COVID-19 pandemic in Singapore, SYF performances at the SCH resumed in 2023.

For the SCH's 50th anniversary in 2015, the SCO organised events including a picture exhibition, a community concert, a building tour and a talk by Lim Chong Keat. The SCH was renovated again from July 2017 to March 2018. These included restoring the two staircases, expanding the stage, and improving wheelchair accessibility to the concert hall. An SCO concert Rhapsodies of Spring 2018: Home for the New Year marked the reopening of the SCH to the public on 26 January 2018. The concert was hosted by Singapore's prominent artistes Mark Lee and Chen Biyu.
