= Boon Tat Street =

Street in Singapore

Coordinates: 1.2808°N 103.849°E

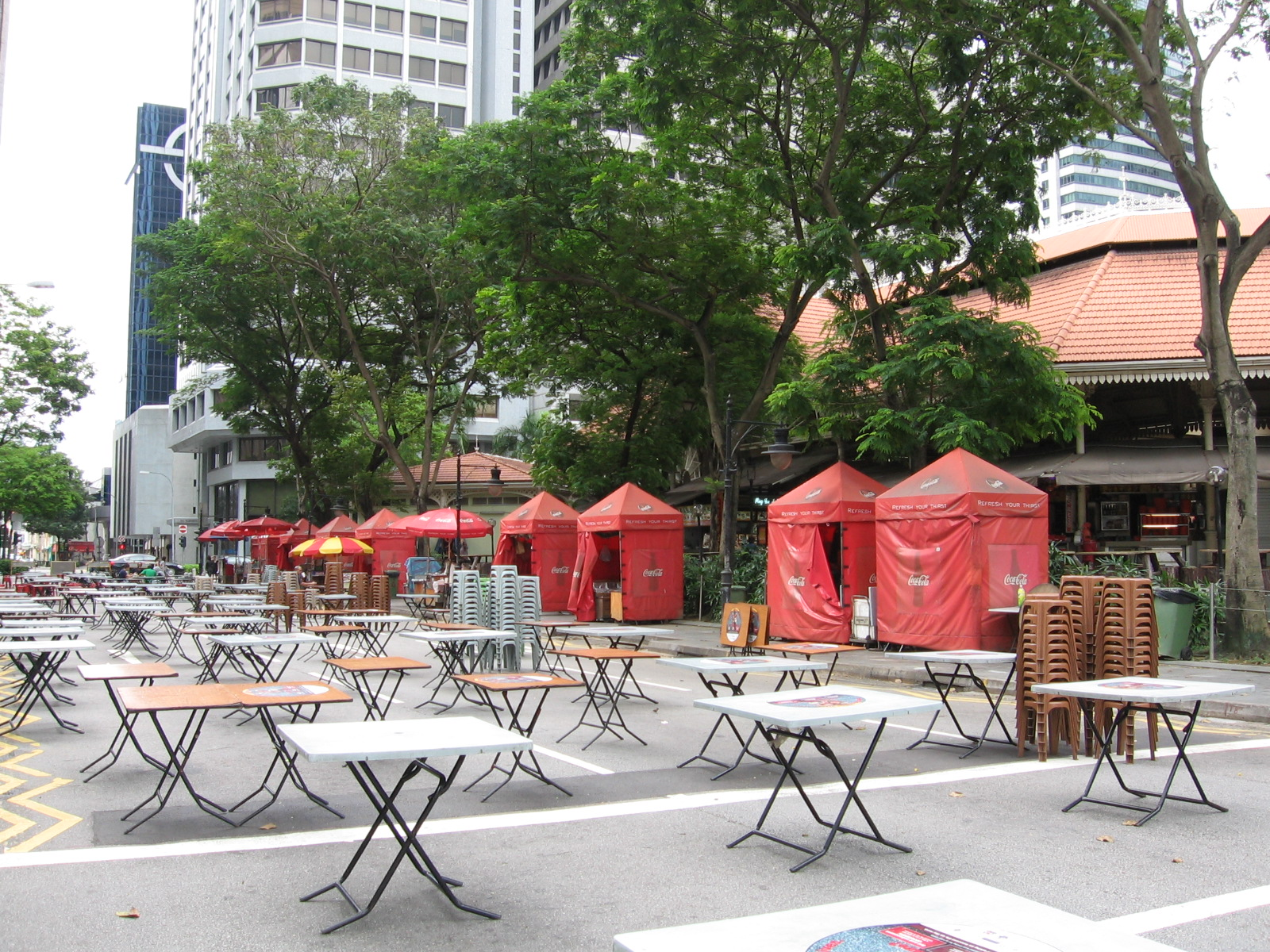
The stretch of Boon Tat Street beside Lau Pa Sat is closed to vehicular traffic at night, and stalls selling satay and dining areas then line up along the street.

Boon Tat Street (simplified Chinese: 文达街; traditional Chinese: 文達街; pinyin: Wén dá jiē), originally Japan Street, is a one-way street in the Downtown Core of Central Area, Singapore. The street extends from Amoy Street at its western end to the junction of Shenton Way and Raffles Quay.

A portion of the street adjacent to Lau Pa Sat is closed in the evening for stalls selling satay. Boon Tat Street has been labeled as a heritage site by the Urban Redevelopment Authority.

The Hokkiens called this street as ma cho kiong pi (beside the ma cho temple), referring to the Thian Hock Keng temple at Telok Ayer Street.

== Etymology ==
Boon Tat Street was named after former Singapore Municipal Councillor Ong Boon Tat (1888–1941). He was the eldest son of prominent businessman Ong Sam Leong, and one of the founders of the air-conditioned dance hall "New World Amusement Park."

Before the Japanese surrender in 1945, the street was known as "Japan Street." In 1946, due to strong anti-Japanese sentiments among the people, the Municipal Council of colonial Singapore decided to rename it Boon Tat Street.

== See also ==
- Nagore Durgha
- Telok Ayer Chinese Methodist Church
