= Prince Edward Road MRT station =

Mass Rapid Transit station in Singapore

Prince Edward Road CC32 爱德华太子路 (Note: pinyin: Àidéhuá tàizǐlù) பிரின்ஸ் எட்வர்ட் ரோடு
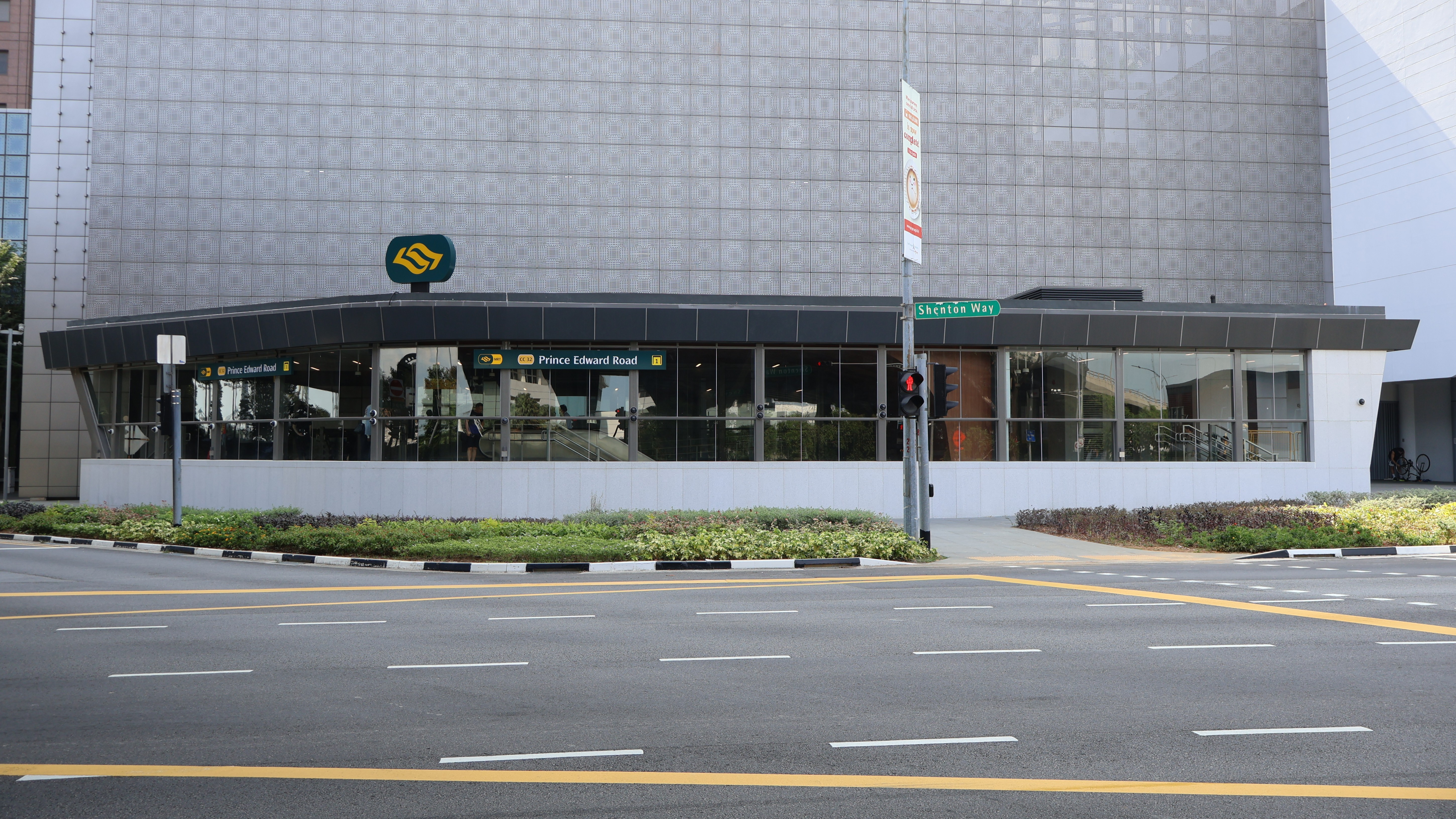
- Exit 1 of the station

General information
- Location: 80 Shenton Way, Singapore 079122
- Coordinates: 01°16′24″N 103°50′50″E
- System: Mass Rapid Transit (MRT) station
- Owner: Land Transport Authority
- Operator: SMRT Trains
- Line: Circle Line
- Platforms: 2 (2 stacked platforms)
- Tracks: 2
- Connections: Bus (Shenton Way Bus Terminal), taxi

Construction
- Structure type: Underground
- Depth: 30 metres (98 ft)
- Platform levels: 2
- Accessible: Yes

History
- Opened: 12 July 2026; 3 months ago
- Former names: Prince Edward, Palmer Road, Parsi Road

Services
Preceding station	Mass Rapid Transit	Following station
Cantonment Clockwise	Circle Line	Marina Bay Anticlockwise
Cantonment towards Dhoby Ghaut	Circle Line	Terminus
Track layout
Location
- Location within Singapore Rail central area

Prince Edward Road MRT station is an underground Mass Rapid Transit (MRT) station on the Circle Line (CCL) in the Downtown Core of Singapore. The station is situated along Shenton Way, near its junctions with Keppel Road and Palmer Road. Surrounding landmarks include Shenton Way Bus Terminal, Hock Teck See Temple, Masjid Haji Muhammad Salleh, Marina Bay Fire Station, the Monetary Authority of Singapore building and the Singapore Conference Hall.

First announced in 2015 as part of Stage 6 of the CCL (CCL6), the station originally had the working name Prince Edward. Construction of the station began in 2017. In 2018, the station was named Prince Edward Road during a naming vote by the Land Transport Authority. The station commenced operations on 12 July 2026 along with the CCL6 stations. The station has a stacked platform arrangement and, as part of the Art in Transit programme, features the artwork Doppler by Gerald Leow.

== History ==
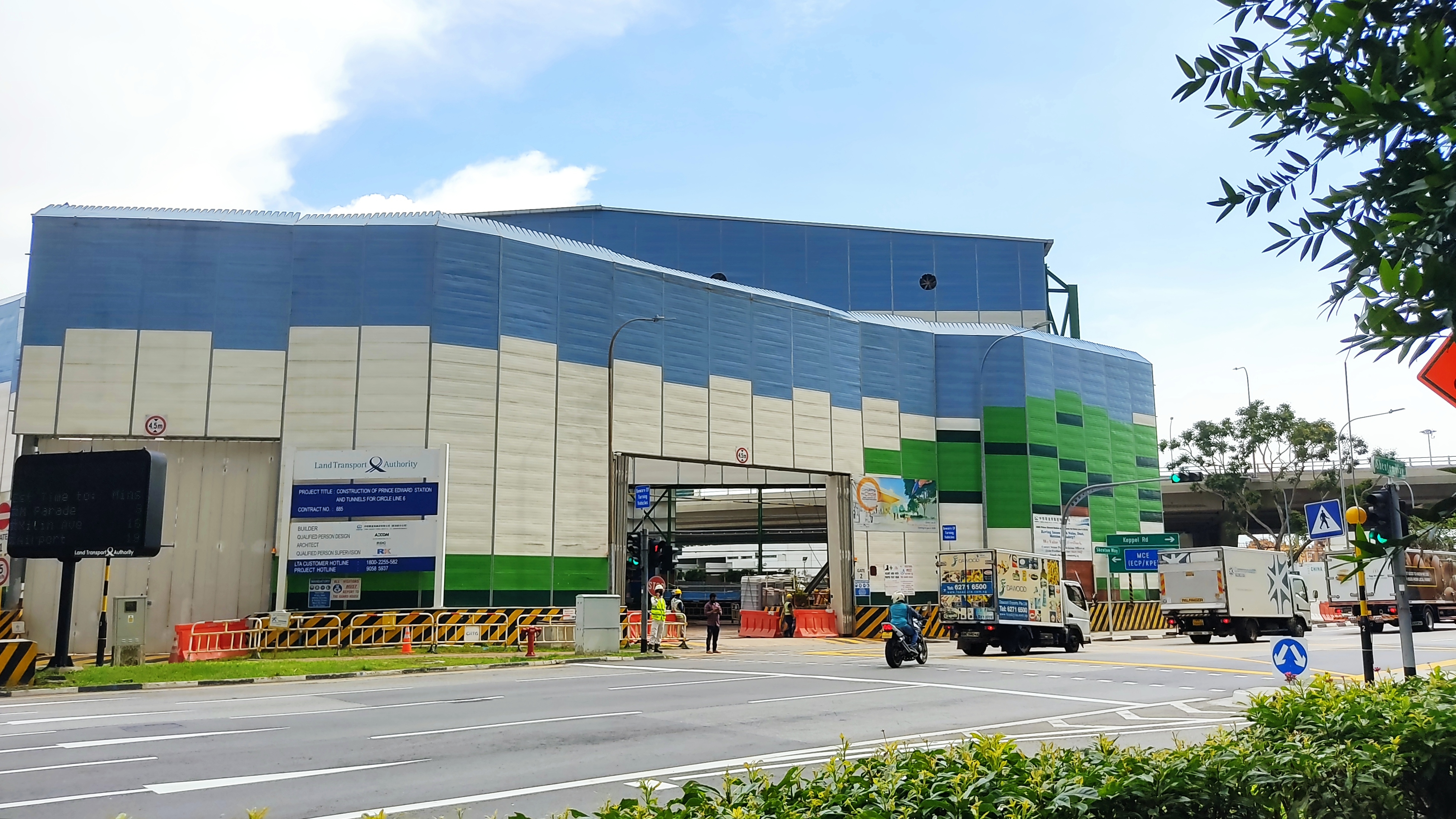
Entrance to the station's construction site

The station was first announced on 29 October 2015 as part of Stage 6 of the Circle Line (CCL6). A contract for the construction of the station and associated tunnels was awarded to China Railway Tunnel Group for S$310.8 million (US$225.07 million) in October 2017. Construction began at the end of 2017, with an expected completion date of 2025.

Three station names – 'Prince Edward Road', 'Palmer Road' and 'Parsi Road' – were shortlisted by the Land Transport Authority (LTA) for public voting. The station name was finalised as Prince Edward Road after voting ended.

To facilitate the station's construction, the Shenton Way Bus Terminal was relocated on 25 June 2017. On 8 March 2020, the concrete casting for the station's underground roof slab was completed. A tunnel boring machine (TBM) had also completed half of the tunnelling works towards the adjacent Cantonment station. Some tunnels were constructed only 3.9 metres (13 ft) from the foundations of a commercial building, necessitating a stacked tunnel arrangement. A protective underground canopy of large steel pipes was installed alongside said arrangement, allowing the station to be constructed beneath Shenton Way while protecting ground-level traffic and structures. This avoided the need for major utility diversions or road closures.

Tunnelling work was temporarily suspended due to measures against COVID-19 before resuming in June 2020. In September, the TBM managed to tunnel underneath the old Tanjong Pagar Railway Station building. The process of tunnelling towards Cantonment station required close monitoring, with devices installed to ensure that no damage was made to the sculptures and interior of the former rail terminus.

Due to the COVID-19 pandemic, transport minister Ong Ye Kung announced in March 2021 that CCL6 would open in 2026. In December 2024, transport minister Chee Hong Tat announced that CCL6 was targeted to open in the first half of 2026. In February 2026, transport minister Jeffrey Siow said that the extension's opening depended on the completion of then-ongoing CCL tunnel strengthening works, as said works were necessary to allow for the final testing and preparation of CCL6. The station commenced operations on 12 July 2026 after a preview on 4 July.

== Details ==
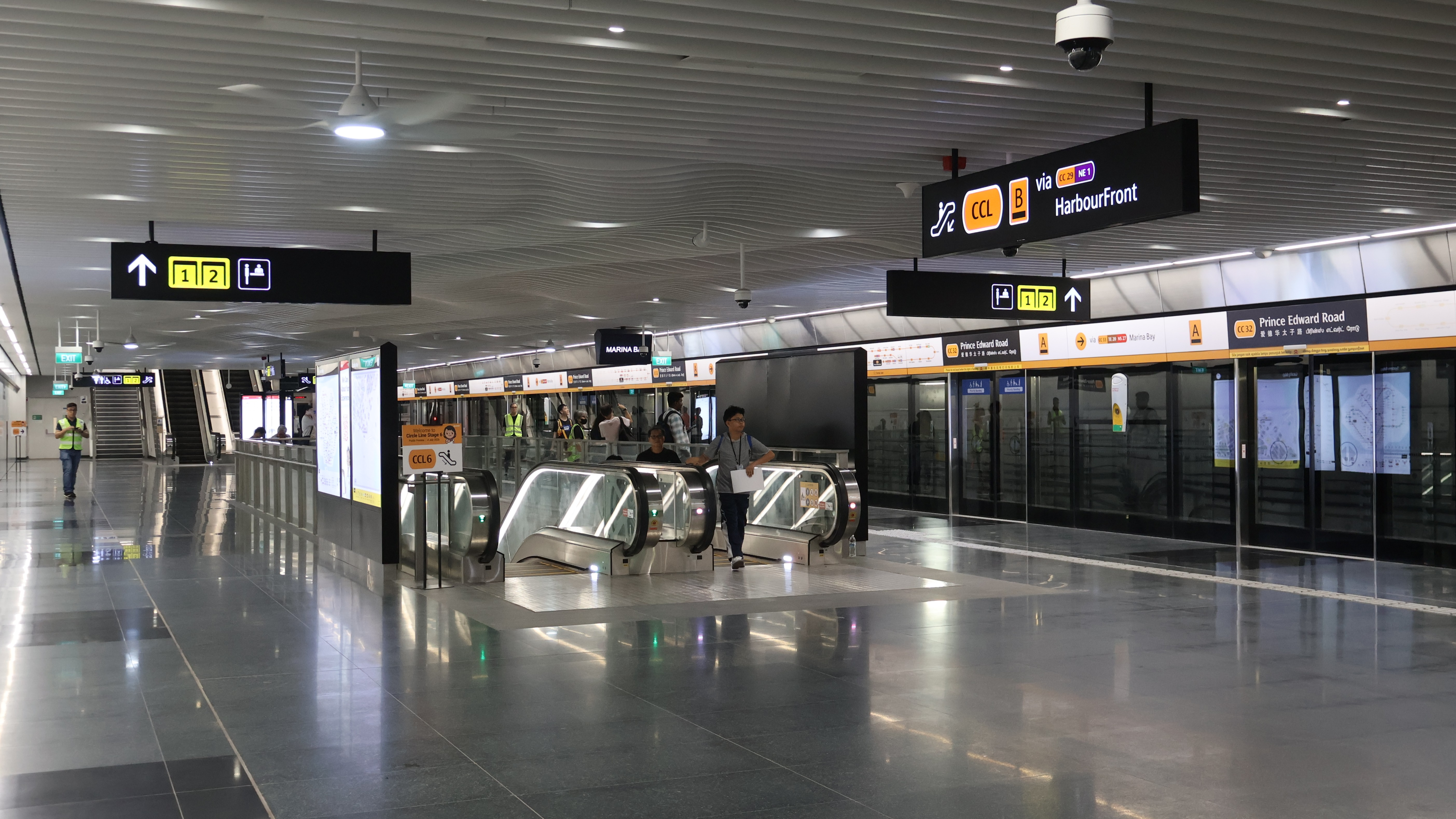
Platform A of the station. Platform door markers are visible on the walled-off side of the platform.

Prince Edward Road station serves the CCL between Cantonment and Marina Bay stations. Its official station code is CC32. It is located along Shenton Way, near its junctions with Keppel Road and Palmer Road, and is close to the heritage buildings of Hock Teck See Temple and Masjid Haji Muhammad Salleh. Other surrounding landmarks include Tanjong Pagar Green Community Park, Tanjong Pagar Plaza Market & Hawker Centre, Marina Bay Fire Station, the Monetary Authority of Singapore building and the Singapore Conference Hall. The station is also within walking distance to Shenton Way Bus Terminal and Tanjong Pagar station on the East–West Line.

Designed by RDC Architects, Prince Edward Road station has two entrances along Shenton Way, and comprises three underground levels with two stacked side platforms, with provisions for an extra platform on each platform level. A 100-metre (330 ft) section of the station resembles the hull of a ship, referencing the area's maritime heritage. The ceiling panels are also modelled after the movement of waves. The station is the longest of the CCL6 stations, and has 184 bicycle parking spaces.

The station features Doppler by Gerald Leow as part of the Art in Transit programme. Spanning the 60-metre (200 ft) corridor leading to Exit 2 of the station, the work comprises circular stainless steel forms. The circular motifs were inspired by the Doppler effect and symbolise invisible forces such as sound waves and air currents. The spirals reference maritime propellers from the adjacent port, reflecting the continuous, rhythmic transit of ships, cargo, and commuters through the harbour. The steel forms were heated to different temperatures to produce varied hues, with their shifting colours intended to capture the attention of passing commuters and encourage visual curiosity and reflection.
