= UIC Building =

Office skyscraper in Singapore

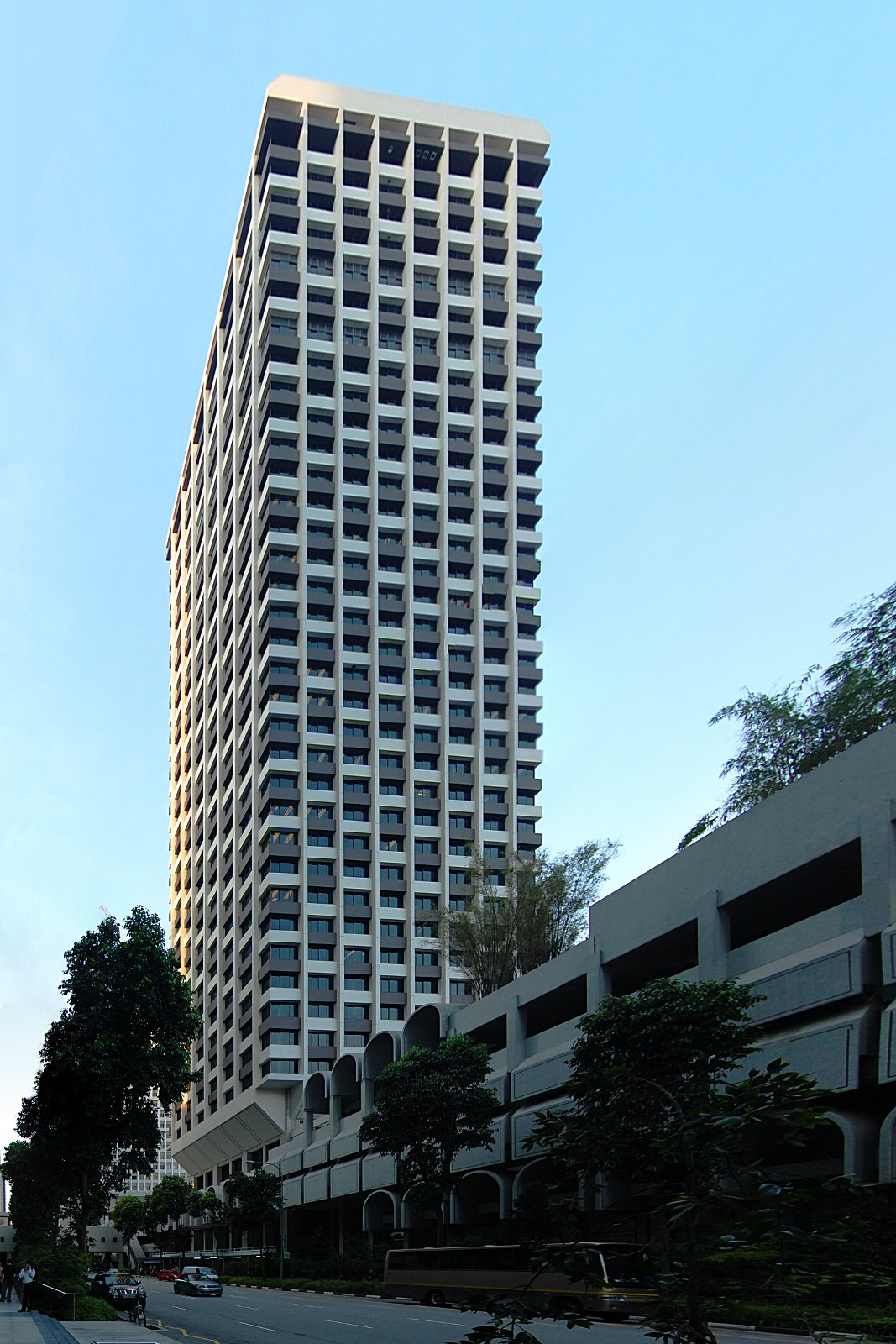

- Location within Singapore
- Alternative names: United Industrial Corporation Limited Building

General information
- Status: Demolished
- Type: Commercial offices
- Architectural style: Brutalist
- Location: 5 Shenton Way, Singapore 068808
- Coordinates: 1°16′40.51″N 103°50′58.49″E
- Completed: 1973; 53 years ago
- Demolished: 2013; 13 years ago

Height
- Roof: 152 m (499 ft)

Technical details
- Floor count: 40

Design and construction
- Architects: Chan Kui Chuan; Singapore Associate Architects
- Developer: United Industrial Corporation Limited

The UIC Building (United Industrial Corporation Limited Building) was a former 40-storey, 152 m (499 ft) skyscraper in the city-state of Singapore.

== History ==
The tower was completed in 1973, and it was the 39th-tallest building in Singapore, tied in rank with Chevron House, Meritus Mandarin Singapore Tower Two, and One Marina Boulevard. At the time of its 1973 completion, the UIC Building was the tallest structure in the city-state and one of the tallest buildings in Southeast Asia, and also met the higher skyscraper threshold of 150 m (490 ft). It retained the former title for only one year, as the 162 m (531 ft) United Overseas Bank Plaza Two was completed in 1974. The building was renovated in 1986 and was given a new concrete facade in the Brutalist style of architecture.

In 2007, United Industrial Corporation, under a collective sale, bought the 21.2 per cent of the UIC Building that it did not already own in order for a redevelopment.

In 2012, during demolition works of the building, part of the building gave way and collapsed, causing injuries to a worker.

Demolition work had been completed in 2013. A new development by United Industrial Corporation which includes a mix of residential and commercial units known as V on Shenton (Five on Shenton) was started on its former site and was completed in 2017.

== See also ==
- List of tallest buildings in Singapore
- List of tallest voluntarily demolished buildings

Records
Preceded by Meritus Mandarin Singapore Tower One	Tallest building in Singapore; 152 m (499 ft); 1973–1974	Succeeded by United Overseas Bank Plaza Two
