= Shenton Way Bus Terminal =

Bus terminal in Downtown Core, Singapore

Shenton Way Bus Terminal 珊顿大道巴士终站 Pertukaran Bas Shenton Way
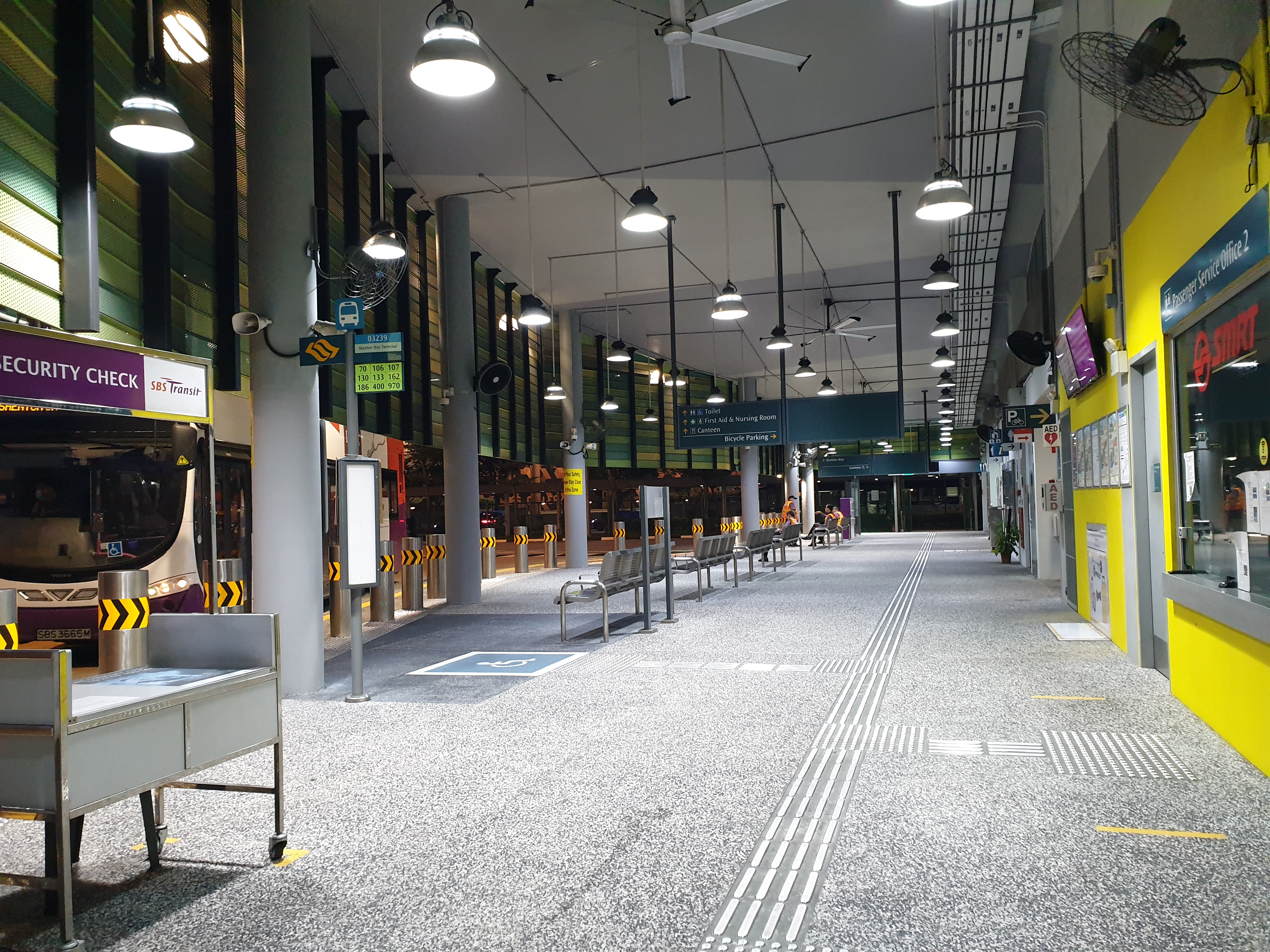
- Interior view of the terminal, captured in 2022.

General information
- Location: 31 Shenton Way, Singapore 079121
- Coordinates: 1°16′23″N 103°50′48″E
- System: Public bus terminal
- Owner: Land Transport Authority
- Operator: SBS Transit (ComfortDelGro)
- Bus routes: 7 (SBS Transit); 1 (SMRT Buses); 1 (Tower Transit Singapore)
- Bus stands: 1 boarding berth No alighting berth
- Bus operators: SBS Transit; SMRT Buses; Tower Transit Singapore
- Connections: CC32 Prince Edward Road

Construction
- Structure type: At-grade
- Cycle facilities: Yes (150 lots)
- Accessible: Accessible alighting/boarding points Accessible public toilets Graduated kerb edges Tactile guidance system

History
- Opened: 20 June 1987; 39 years ago

Key dates
- 20 June 1987: Commenced operations
- 26 April 2010: Operations transferred to Palmer Road
- 25 June 2017: Operations transferred to Shenton Way
Location

Shenton Way Bus Terminal (Note: Malay: Pertukaran Bus Shenton Way; Chinese: 珊顿道巴士终站) is a bus terminal in Singapore. It is located along its namesake road, Shenton Way, in Downtown Core. The first iteration of the bus terminal was opened on 20 June 1987, before being relocated twice in order to make way for other development works. The bus terminal was first moved to Palmer Road in 2010, before being shifted to its present location along Shenton Way in 2017.

== History ==
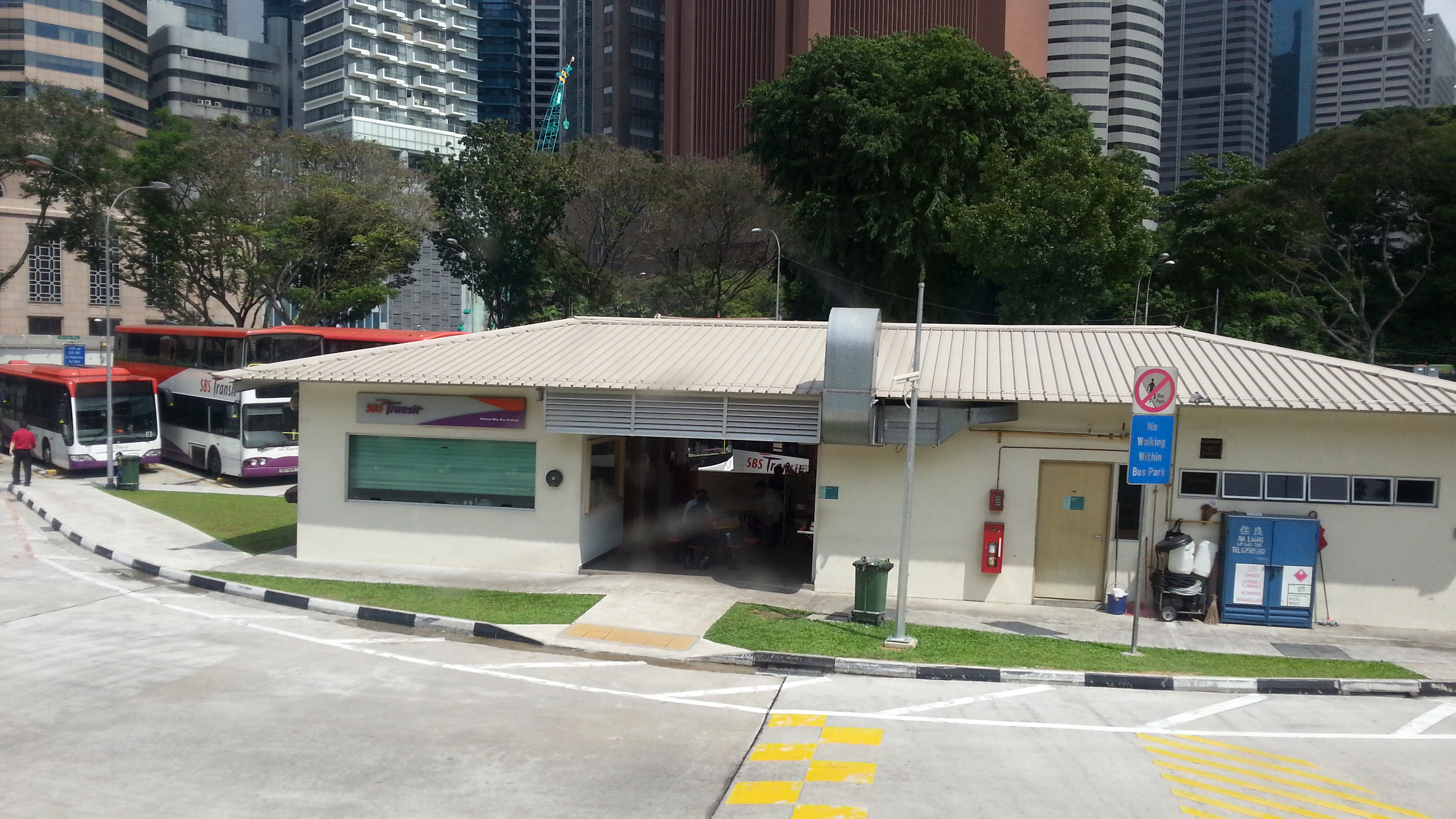
Exterior view of the former Shenton Way Bus Terminal at Palmer Road

=== Original terminal ===
The original Shenton Way Bus Terminal was designed and built by the former Public Works Department (now CPG Corporation) at an unspecified location under a viaduct carrying the East Coast Parkway. Its location was seen by The Straits Times as unusual, as it reported that no other bus terminals were being built under viaducts at the time. The bus terminal was later transferred to the Ministry of Communications and Information on 20 June 1987, in a ceremony presided by Ho Kah Leong, and began operations towards the end of the month.

=== First relocation ===
The bus terminal was first relocated to Palmer Road on 26 April 2010 to make way for the construction of the Marina Coastal Expressway. However, as the bus terminal itself was not open to the public, commuters had to disembark or board buses at two bus stops in front of the bus terminal (one for alighting only; the other for boarding only) due to restrictions imposed on the public against entering the bus terminal premises.

=== Second relocation ===
Initially announced in October 2015, the bus terminal was then relocated again to Shenton Way on 25 June 2017 to make way for the construction of Prince Edward Road MRT station, as part of the Circle line Stage 6 extension scheduled to be completed by 2026. CCECC Singapore Pte Ltd was selected to construct the relocated bus terminal as part of Contract 8812. Existing bus services were amended to serve the relocated bus terminal on that day, skipping Palmer Road entirely. Unlike the Palmer Road terminal, the new terminal allows boarding within the terminal itself; however, alighting from buses continues to be performed at a separate bus stop, also located in front of the bus terminal. The relocated bus terminal also features new amenities that were not present in the Palmer Road terminal, such as a priority queue zone, bicycle parking lots and an air-conditioned staff lounge.

== Bus contracting model ==
Under the bus contracting model, all bus services operating from Shenton Way Bus Terminal were divided into 6 bus packages, operated by three different bus operators.

=== List of bus services ===
Operator	Package	Routes
SBS Transit	Bishan–Toa Payoh	186
SBS Transit	Bukit Merah	121, 400
SBS Transit	Seletar	70, 130, 133
SBS Transit	Sengkang–Hougang	107
SMRT Buses	Choa Chu Kang–Bukit Panjang	970
Tower Transit Singapore	Bulim	106
