= AXA Tower =

Office skyscraper in Singapore

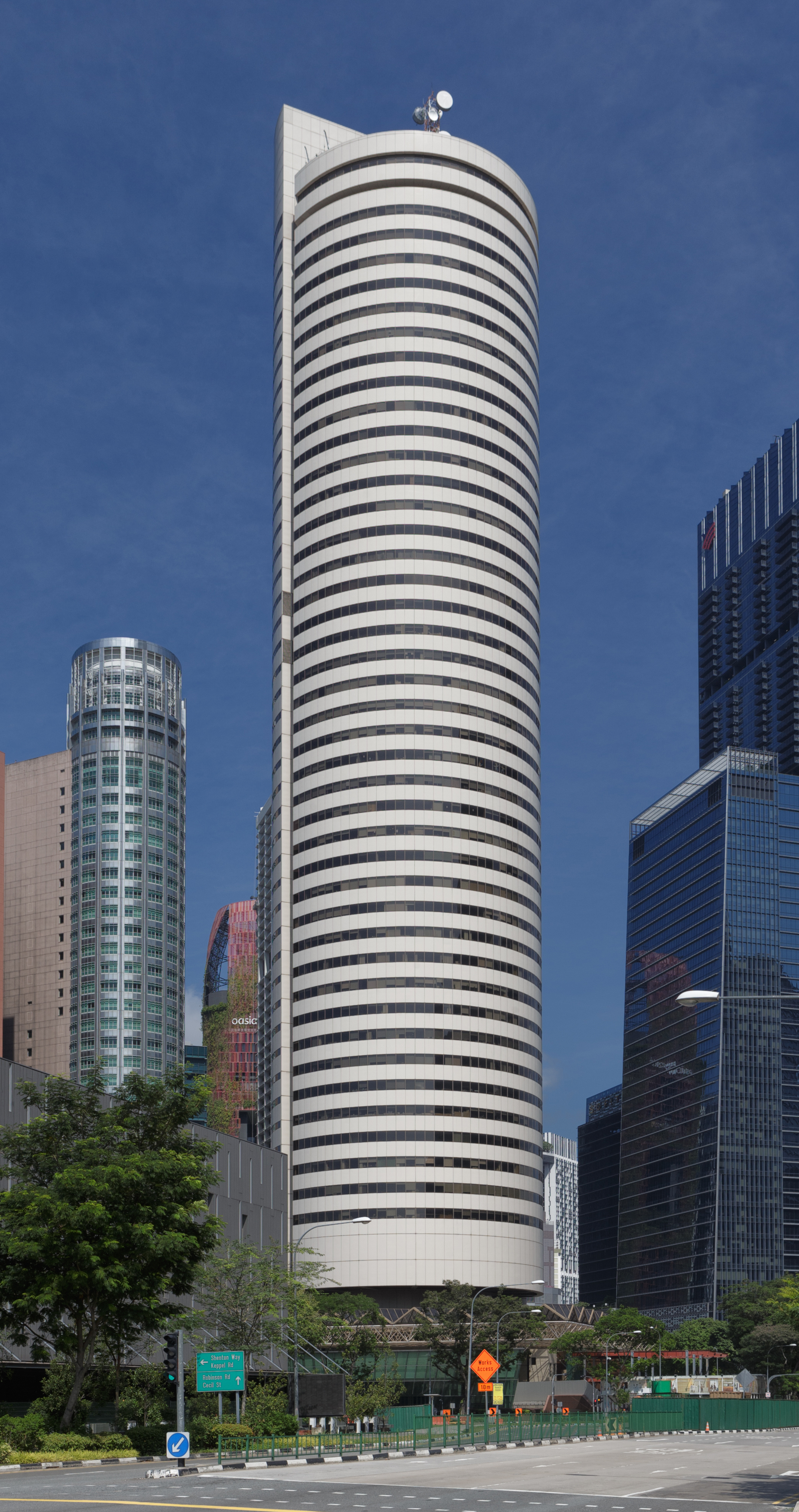
- AXA Tower in 2018
- Interactive map of the AXA Tower area
- Former names: Singapore Treasury Building; Temasek Tower
- Alternative names: 8 Shenton Way

General information
- Status: Demolished
- Type: Commercial
- Location: 8 Shenton Way, Singapore 068811, Singapore
- Coordinates: 1.2758°N 103.8472°E
- Named for: AXA
- Construction started: 1982; 44 years ago
- Completed: 1986; 40 years ago
- Closed: 2022; 4 years ago
- Demolished: 2023; 3 years ago
- Owner: MGP Raffle Pte Ltd

Height
- Roof: 234.7 m (770 ft)

Technical details
- Floor count: 52
- Lifts/elevators: 22

Design and construction
- Architects: The Stubbins Associates; Architects 61; Architects Team 3
- Developer: Singapore Ministry of Finance
- Main contractor: MGP Raffle Pte Ltd

AXA Tower, also known as 8 Shenton Way and formerly The Treasury and Temasek Tower, was the 16th-tallest skyscraper in Singapore, standing at 234.7 m (770 ft). It held the distinction of being the tallest cylindrical building in the world. In 2023, it became the tallest building ever to be voluntarily demolished to make way for the construction of Skywaters Residences.

== History ==
Built in 1986 for the Ministry of Finance of Singapore as the Treasury Building, the 52-storey tower quickly became one of the most prominent buildings in the city’s business district. It was later home to the Asia Pacific Headquarters of the advertising agency BBDO Worldwide, while the 14th floor housed the Embassy of Belgium. When the Ministry moved to The Treasury on High Street, the building was transferred to Temasek Holdings, a government-owned corporation, and renamed Temasek Tower. It was later acquired by CapitaLand, which sold it in April 2007 to MGP Raffle Pte Ltd, after which it was renamed AXA Tower. On 6 May 2020, Alibaba Group agreed to acquire a 50 per cent stake in the property, valuing it at S$1.68 billion.

In early May 2022, AXA Tower closed to the public and all tenants relocated in preparation for its demolition.

=== Subsequent use of the site ===
On 7 July, the Urban Redevelopment Authority (URA) approved redevelopment plans submitted by a consortium involving Alibaba, Perennial Holdings and local partners. The proposal outlined a new 63-storey mixed-use skyscraper rising to 1,001 feet (305 metres), making it the tallest building ever approved in Singapore and the first supertall. The future development, named Skywaters Residences, will feature office, residential and hotel components, along with retail areas and an observation level, and is expected to be completed by 2028. The developers appointed Skidmore, Owings & Merrill, the firm responsible for the design of the Burj Khalifa in Dubai, to lead the architecture for the new tower.

== Architecture and gallery ==
The structure consisted of steel beams cantilevered from a cylindrical concrete core, allowing full 360° views at the perimeter, unobstructed by perimeter columns. The tower housed sixteen double deck elevators supplied by Otis.

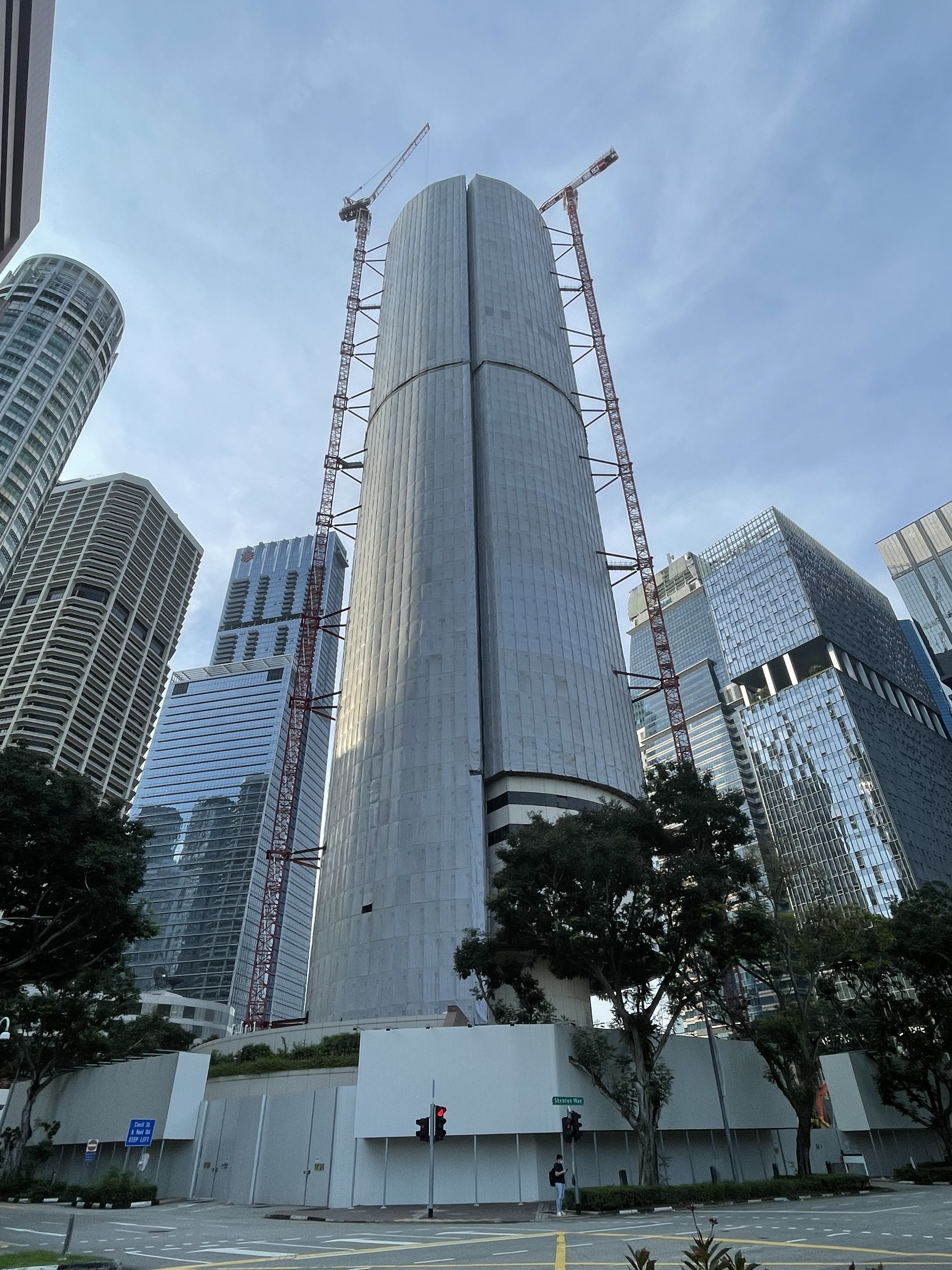
AXA Tower in September 2022, after it was closed to the public and preparations for demolition had begun.

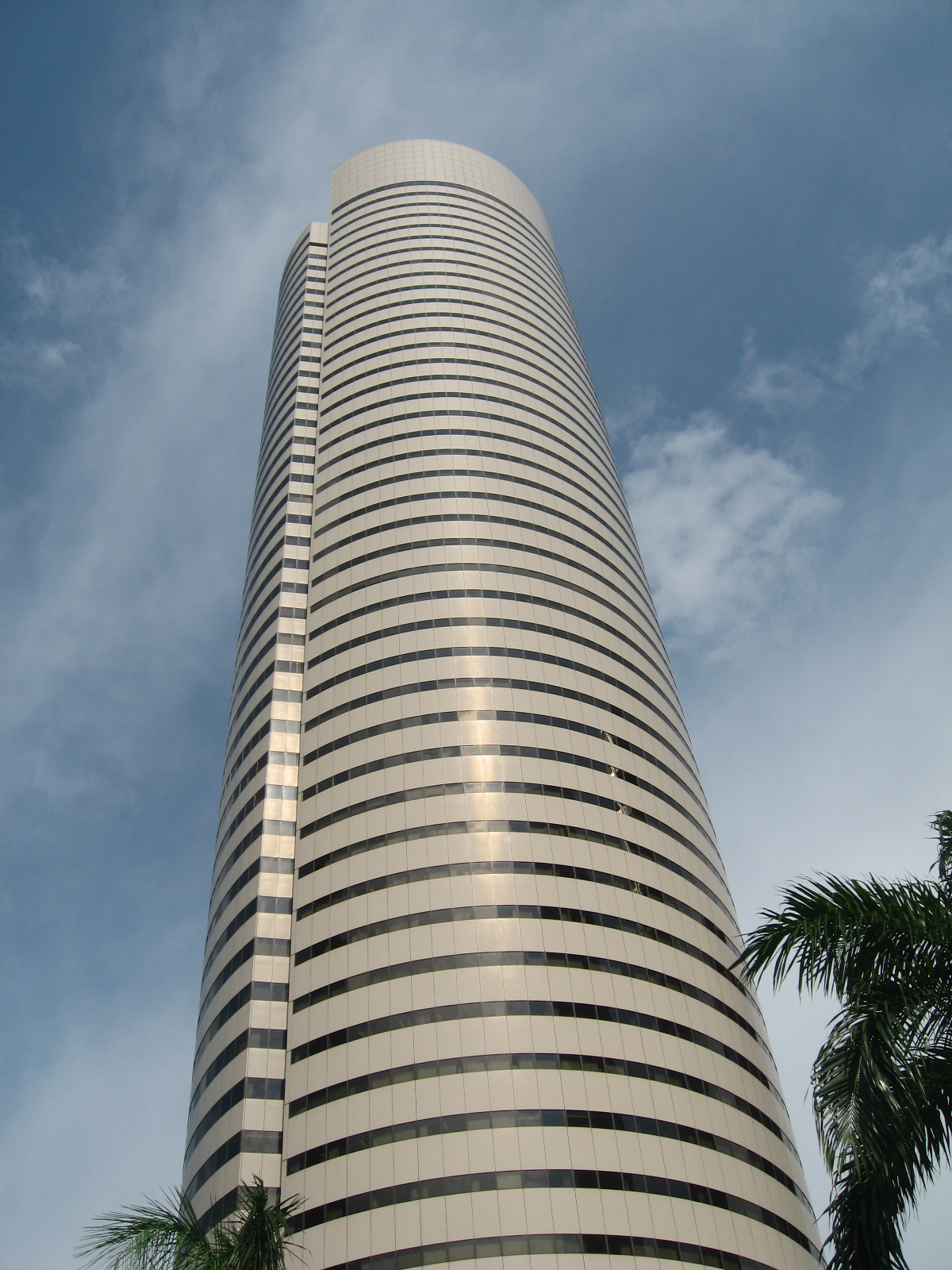

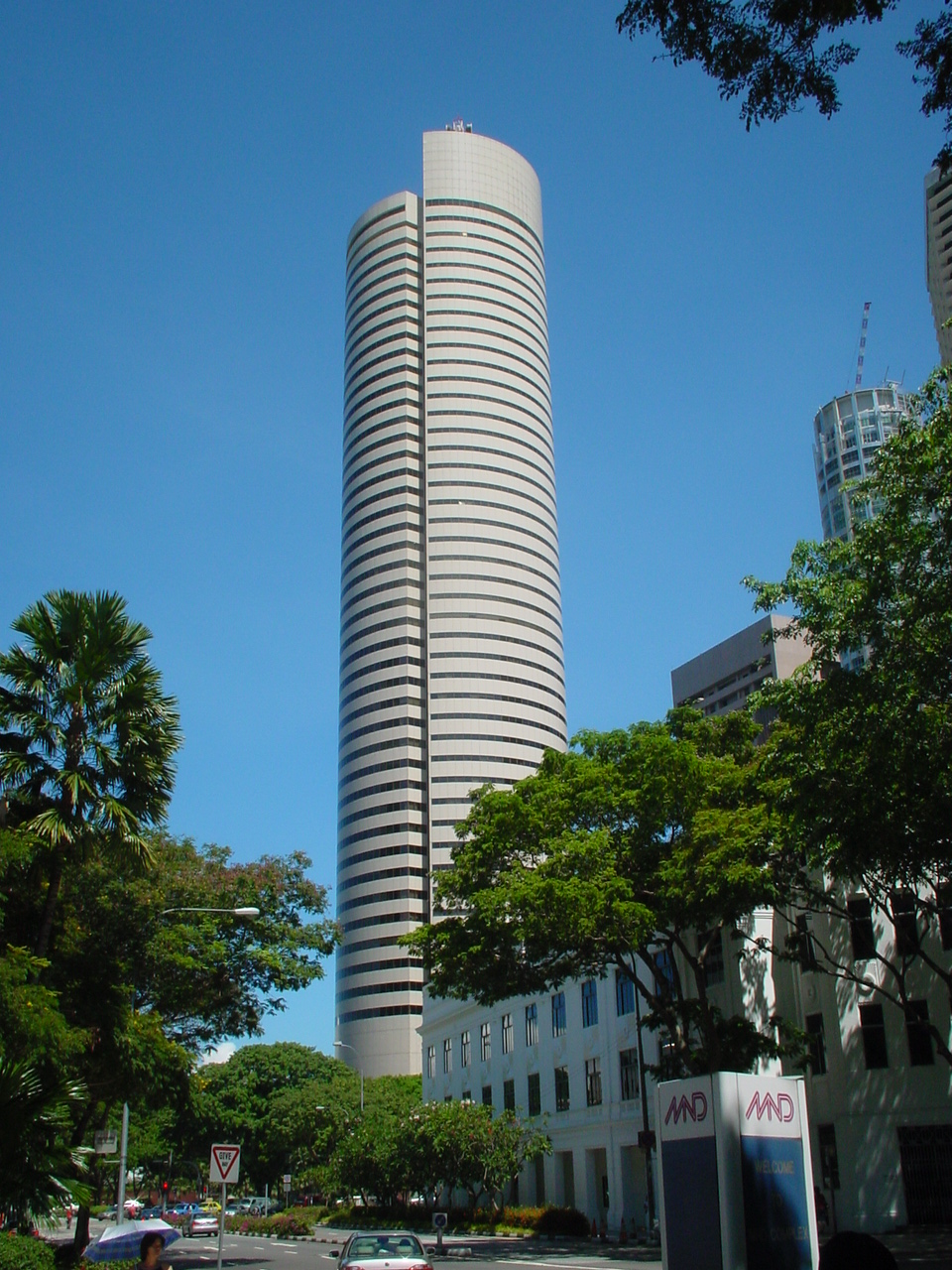

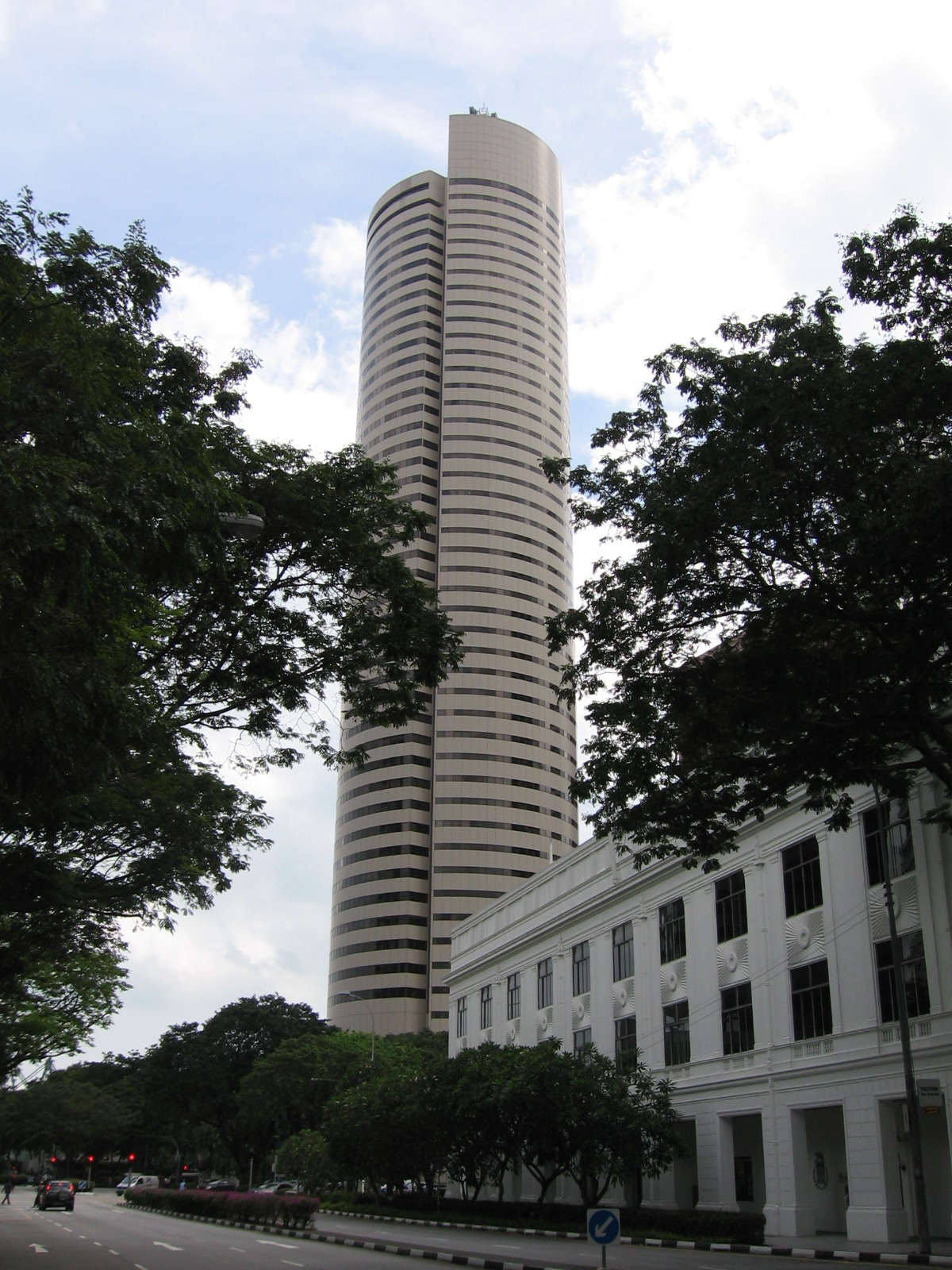

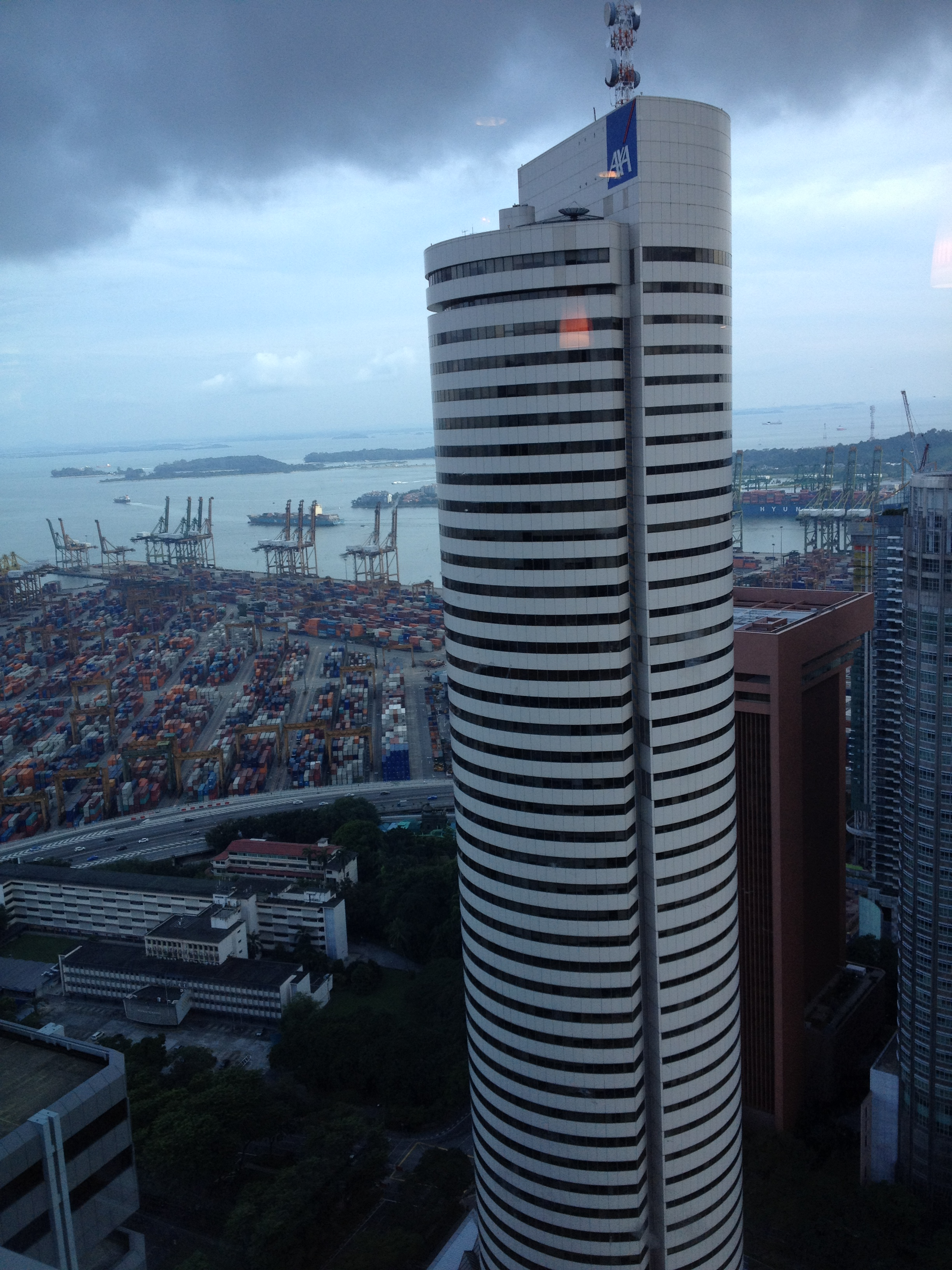

== See also ==
- List of tallest buildings in Singapore
- List of buildings
