= V on Shenton =

Mixed-use skyscraper in Singapore

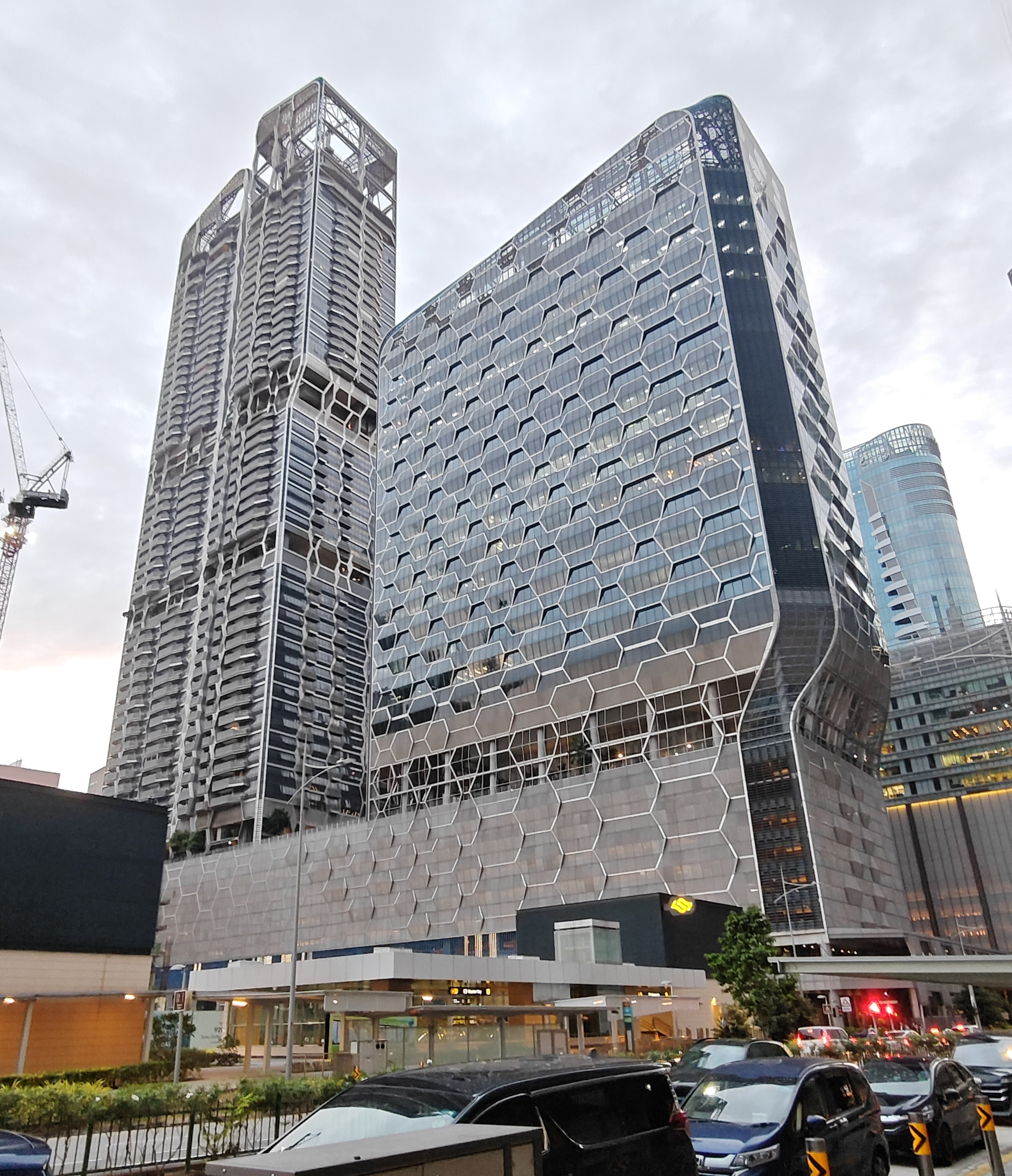
- Interactive map of the V on Shenton area

General information
- Type: Mixed residential and commercial
- Location: 5 Shenton Way, Singapore
- Coordinates: 1°16′40.51″N 103°50′58.49″E
- Completed: 2017; 9 years ago (estimated)

Height
- Roof: 237 m (778 ft)

Technical details
- Floor count: 54

Design and construction
- Architects: Ben van Berkel of UN Studio; Architect 61
- Developer: United Industrial Corporation Limited

Other information
- Public transit access: TE19 Shenton Way

Website
- V on Shenton

V on Shenton (pronounced as Five on Shenton) is a 54-storey, 237 m (778 ft) mixed residential and commercial development located at 5 Shenton Way, Singapore.

== Background ==
It was developed by UIC Investments (Properties) Pte. Ltd., and was completed in 2017 on the former site of the UIC Building.

The new development comprises one Office Tower (23 storeys) and one Residential Tower (54 storeys). The 99-year leasehold (from 1969) residential tower features a lap pool, Laundromat, outdoor island kitchens and gymnasium. Most of the higher-floor units offered unobstructed views of the sea and city. The 23-storey office tower would not be released for sale and be kept for the group's own investment purposes. The building complex also have 588 car park lots.

== See also ==
- List of tallest buildings in Singapore
- List of buildings
