= One Shenton Way =

Residential skyscraper in Singapore

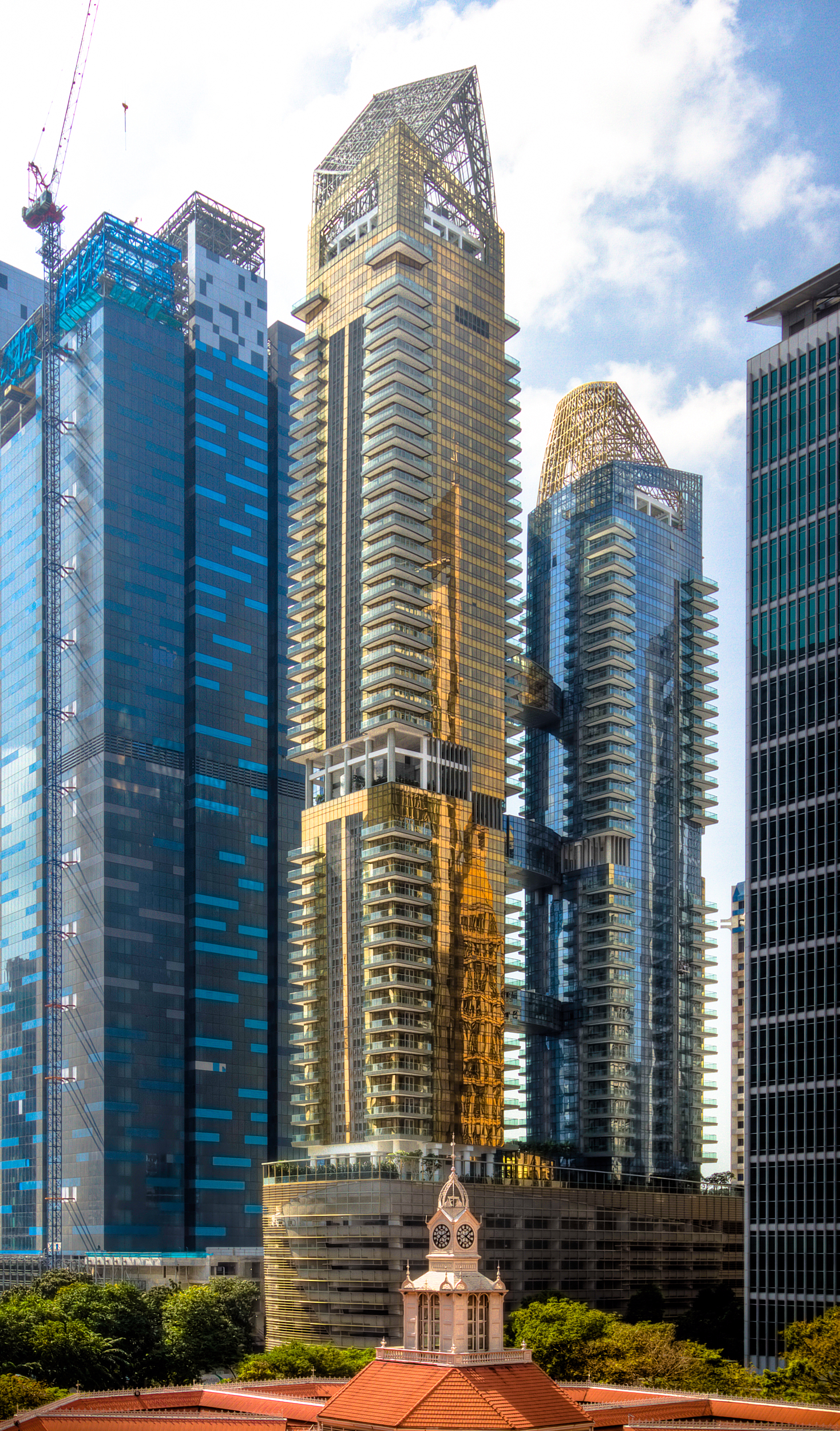
- One Shenton Way
- Interactive map of the One Shenton Way area

General information
- Status: Completed
- Type: Residential
- Architectural style: High-rise
- Location: Shenton Way, Downtown Core, Singapore
- Coordinates: 1.2792538°N 103.8505465°E
- Construction started: 2008
- Completed: 2011

Technical details
- Floor count: 50 (One Shenton Tower 1), 42 (One Shenton Tower 2)

Design and construction
- Architects: Ott & Associates Architects, USA
- Developer: City Developments Limited
- Main contractor: Hyundai Engineering & Construction Co. Ltd

One Shenton is a high end real estate redevelopment project with 341 apartments along Shenton Way in the Tanjong Pagar area of Singapore. It consists of two towers, the tallest of which is 50 stories. It was completed in 2011 and is notable for its two tower construction. Two sides of each tower is clad in gold and two sides in blue glass panels. The first floor is retail space and includes a convenience store, a wine bar, cafes and award winning restaurants. The car park has 383 lots and is available to both residents and non residents at competitive rates.

New facilities were added over the years catered to families and long term residents. One Shenton is the only high rise building in Singapore that is fitted with biometric and face recognition entrance access at all entry points, increasing safety and eliminating the need for residents to carry access cards.

== Facilities ==
=== Lobby (Ground Level) ===
- Concierge
- Lounge
- First high rise condo in Singapore with Biometrics and face recognition access

=== Club Level (Level 8 ) ===
- Indoor Kids room
- Chlorine-free (salted) 50 meter lap Pool
- Chlorine-free (salted) and heated children pool
- Sun Deck
- Cabanas
- Function Room
- Entertainment Terrace
- Outdoor Gourmet Cooking
- Lounge/Refreshment/Juice Bar
- Games Rooms with table football table and Pool/Billiard
- Library/piano room
- Outdoor children playground including springfree trampoline
- Laundry Room

=== Wellness Level (Level 24 & 25) ===
- Sky Gym
- Sky Gardens & BBQ
- Spa Onsen and jaccuzi (chlorine-free, salted water)
- Sauna and cold plunge bath
- Outdoor Exercise Terrace & Yoga

== See also ==
- List of tallest buildings in Singapore
- List of buildings
