= Cheatle =

Cheatle is a surname. Notable people with the surname include:

- Alexandra Cheatle (born 1994), British singer-songwriter known by her stage name Zyra (singer)
- Alfred Edward Cheatle (1841–1941), British architect
- Arthur Henry Cheatle (1866–1929), British surgeon
- Duncan Cheatle, British businessman
- George Lenthal Cheatle (1865–1951), British surgeon
- Giles Cheatle (1953–2024), English cricketer
- Kimberly Cheatle (born 1970/1971), American former director of the United States Secret Service
- Lauren Cheatle (born 1998), Australian cricketer and daughter of Giles
- Syd Cheatle (1936–2018), Irish architect and writer

== See also ==
- Cheadle (disambiguation)
