= Bonham Building =

Building in Singapore

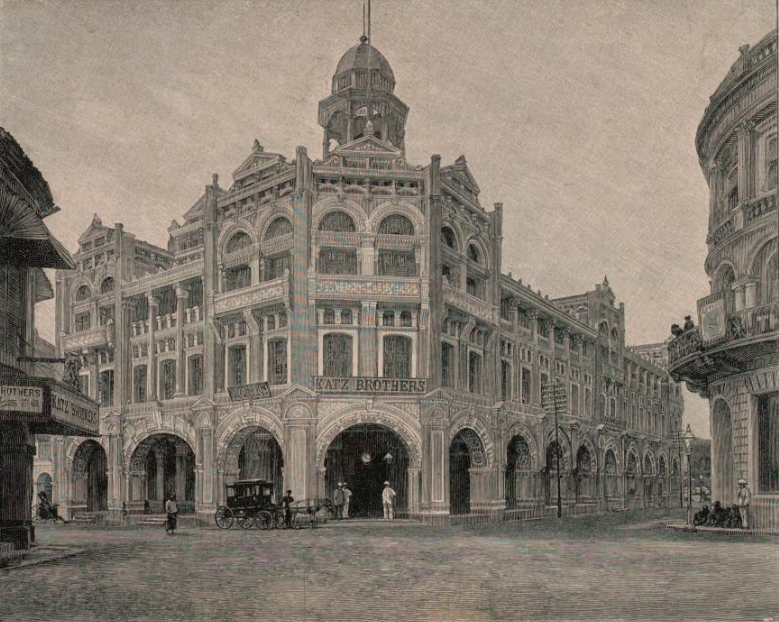
- The Bonham Building at the corner of Bonham Street and Chulia Street in 1902
- Interactive map of the Bonham Building area

General information
- Coordinates: 1.2854°N 103.8509°E
- Construction started: Early 1894
- Opening: 27 March 1897
- Demolished: Mid-1970

Design and construction
- Architecture firm: Crane Brothers

The Bonham Building was a historic landmark at the corner of Bonham Street and Chulia Street in Singapore. Work on the block began in early 1894 after a fire razed a number of godowns along Bonham Street and was projected to finish by 1896. However, a collapse toward the end of 1895 killed 11 labourers and caused a major delay in construction. Completed in 1897 as the Katz Brothers Building, it served as the premises of the Katz Brothers until 1912, when the firm relocated to Raffles Place.

The local branch of the Yokohama Specie Bank moved in in 1916 and it was in this period that the building came to be known as the Bonham Building. The bank relocated in 1933, and two years after it became the headquarters of the newly founded United Chinese Bank, later renamed the United Overseas Bank. It also emerged as a centre for local law firms, though by the 1950s it had gained a reputation for housing "struggling" or "lesser known" law firms and "mediocre" lawyers. The structure was demolished in 1970 to make way for the UOB Building.

== Description ==
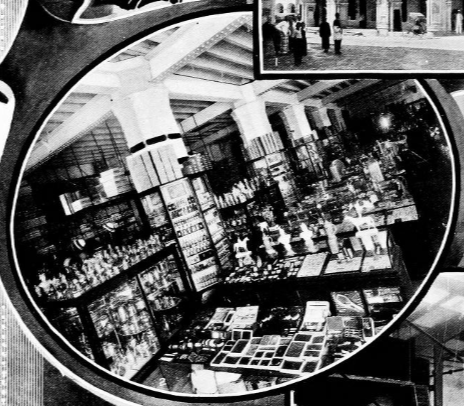
The salesroom, as pictured in Twentieth Century Impressions of British Malaya (1908)

The "ornate" three-storey block, at the corner of Bonham Street and Chulia Street, running the full length of the latter to the junction with Boat Quay, was described in The Straits Times as being "executed in the style of the Renaissance" and in the Singapore Free Press And Mercantile Advertiser as being "of the Classical Renaissance style of architecture", though writer Julian Davison noted that the newspapers of the day often described "any kind of building with a vaguely Classical mien" as 'Renaissance'. There were corinthian pillars accompanied by "handsome" capitals. The façade was to be light grey and white in colour. The original plan for the structure called for "customary stucco work" and an "exceptionally large" frontage at the main entrance on the corner of Bonham Street and Chulia Street, being 70ft tall. Facing onto Raffles Place, it was to feature an "effective display" in the "shape of a handsome clock tower". This tower element later became a dome. The corner of Bonham Street and Boat Quay was to be similar, though without the dome. The building was to run the entire 218ft length of Bonham Street and 34ft along Boat Quay. In addition to the main entrance, there were two other entrances; one on Bonham Street and the other on Boat Quay. The Straits Times considered it "one of the most ornamental business houses in the Far East, with "architectural attractions" on all three frontages.

The building's interior featured "very lofty and spacious" rooms, made "absolutely secure" through the ironwork, with iron frames consisting of "cast iron H-section and box section stanchions supporting I-section beams of mild steel." The material, with its "supposed incombustibility", lessened the risk of fires whilst allowing for fewer "cumbersome" load-bearing walls, allowing for a more "flexible" layout. The Bonham Street and Chulia Street corner was to have "well arranged" windows and "extensive" showrooms on the ground floor. The Boat Quay frontage was to have shop space to be let out. Behind the shop on the ground floor were the warehouses which, opened to the quay. The building's lift was found here. There were "massive" columns on the ground floor, which additionally served to delineate the different departments of the store, which were arranged such that patrons would have "no difficulty". The departments on this floor were for 'arms and ammunition', harness and saddlery, bicycles, leather goods and plateware on the right, alcohol, cigarettes and watches and clocks on the left, and the tailoring department at the back, in addition to stationery, lamps and chandeliers.

A wide and "handsome" staircase led to another salesroom on the floor above, which was similar in size and dedicated to furniture, musical instruments and toys. The top floor housed several apartments, fitted with bathrooms, reading, dressing and lounge rooms and to be let out, which "[commanded] a breezy situation with excellent views." There was also a Muslim prayer room, installed as part of a promise Katz Brothers head Hermann Katz had made to Sultan Abu Bakar of Johor, and the working room for the tailoring department. Other amenities available to customers on that floor included a men's smoking room, a ladies' room and bathrooms. The tower had a few long chairs and was intended for siestas.

== History ==
=== Construction and collapse ===
The Katz Brothers, a German trading company and department store founded in 1865, moved into the site at the corner of Bonham Street and what was then known as Kling Street (renamed Chulia Street in 1921), the former Oriental Bank Building, after acquiring its occupants Kahlenbach, Engler & Co. By 1893, it the firm had made plans to redevelop their main building. On the night of 14 November, a fire destroyed much of the buildings along Bonham Street down to Boat Quay, though the property of Katz Brothers suffered comparatively little damage. The firm took the opportunity to expand, leasing the property from Peranakan merchant and landowner Tan Jiak Kim, who was to rebuild the entire block of godowns bound by Bonham Street, Kling Street and Boat Quay, with the intent of occupying the newly-erected structure, with the building at the corner of Bonham Street and Kling Street housing the stores and the godowns behind housing its warehouses.

Architectural firm Crane Brothers was commissioned by Tan to work on the new premises, with Alfred William Lermit initially being put in charge of the site at the corner. Work on the block, which was at 6 & 8 Bonham Street, 31 & 31A Kling Street and 6-8 Boat Quay, and initially named the Kim Seng Building after Tan's grandfather Tan Kim Seng, was to begin in January 1894 and it was initially scheduled to be complete in about 18 months. The plans for the building were approved by Municipal Engineer James MacRitchie, who died in office the year later. The godowns razed by the fire were to be rebuilt first and the firm was to move their head offices into those temporarily while the corner was being built. The site was then on "one of the busiest thoroughfares", thus "[presenting] every advantage for the effective display of their high class stock." The Free Press opined that this was reflective of the "rapid strides which artistic decorative plasterwork [had] taken" in Singapore, with firms "no longer contented with the ultalitarian brick boxes with slate lids which formerly did duty as places of business". The block which was to be temporarily occupied was completed by March 1895, and Katz Brothers moved in on the 5th of that month. It was then expected that the entire block would be completed by August 1896. By September 1895, work on the premises had "pushed on with considerable vigour".

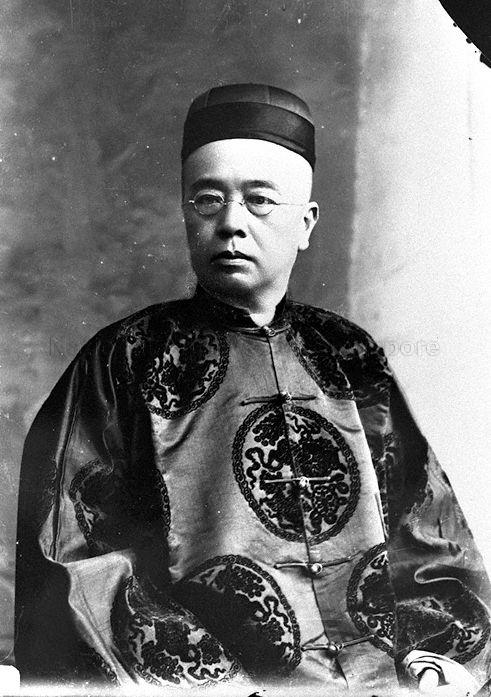
Merchant and landowner Tan Jiak Kim in 1900.

After the foundations were laid by Crane Brothers, Tan chose to have the building "erected without European supervision". Having received a duplicate of the plans, he instead hired local builder Tan Joo Guan (Note: Also referred to as Tan Jew Guan.) as the superintendent and three Chinese contractors led by Peck Kim Sai. (Note: Also referred to as Peck Kam Sai, Peck Kum Si, and Peck Kum Sai.) Tan Joo Guan was not officially certified, though he had been in Tan Jiak Kim's service for several years and had worked under both Crane Brothers and Swan & Maclaren. His work for Tan Jiak Kim included the premises of Kelly & Walsh at 5 Battery Road. He was put in charge of acquiring the material for the construction. Tan Jiak Kim later claimed that he and Crane Brothers had an "understanding" that Joon Guan would consult them if needed. Crane Brothers instead claimed that they "had tried very hard" to be allowed to superintend construction, though they were refused each time they attempted to do so. The store on Boat Quay had been completed early as the tenants, a Chinese shop owned by Lim Boon Keng and A. Meyer, were "anxious to enter", though their moving in was delayed. After this was completed, the labourers carried on to the corner, which consisted of "massive piers only" and they began "running these up perhaps too quickly". The corner facing the square had been nearing completion, save for the dome, which had yet to be placed, and the central block was still "in an incomplete stage".

On the evening of 28 September, the still under construction 80ft-long portion fronting Chulia Street collapsed, killing 11 of the 13 labourers who were sleeping in a wooden shanty in the unfinished five-foot way, and severely injuring another. The only labourer who escaped unscathed, having left the way just before the collapse, reported that there was only a brief "premonitory" rumbling before "several thousand tons of new brickwork [fell] along the lines of the verandah into the street", burying the rest of the labourers. As the incident took place at a time when the typically bustling street was largely "deserted", only labourers on-site at the time were caught in the collapse. The Free Press proclaimed then that the situation was caused indirectly by the lack of the "usual skilled supervision" and then the contractor "running up his buildings unequally in height instead of in uniform layers." The completed portion was 70ft tall, and the adjoining portion had walls built up to 44ft with 24ft piers between them.

Shortly after the collapse, Crane Brothers' chief architect Edward Osborne suggested that the collapse could have been partially attributed to the poor supervision and the "bad" workmanship, with "tall and massive" piers being "run up too rapidly, by far too much at once." The piers carried heavy floors which were built of "soft Chinese bricks and feeble mortar" as opposed to hard bricks and cement. The situation was worsened by an "exceptionally heavy and prolonged" storm the afternoon before the collapse. Osborn noted that the front on Boat Quay, identical to the Kling Street front and having been constructed with the same level of worksmanship still stood, and stated his belief that the piers in the collapsed portion had been "run up too quickly for wet weather", and the heavy rain when the mortar was "just in a spongy position condition ready to absorb all the water it [could] get". It was later found that the second pillar in the building had cracked severely before the collapse, and that this, in addition to the rain and the masonry being "brought on to the cracked pillar too fast", before the mortar could set, had caused the collapse. Peck later claimed to have noticed the cracks on 23 September and informed Joo Guan, but not the building inspector, who he alleged did not visit in between that date and the collapse. Joo Guan claimed that he was not informed of the cracks and that he "did not give up [his] whole time to this building, as [he] had other work to do."

Peck fled shortly after the collapse. He was arrested on a charge of 'culpable homicide not amounting to murder' shortly after. Crane Brothers was finally put in charge of construction, and they were ordered to demolish the structure down to the first floor. In the days following, Katz Brothers and other parties "strongly [urged]" the Municipality to conduct an "exhaustive survey" of the buildings adjoining the portion which had collapsed. Howard Newton, then acting as Municipal Engineer, had "very little assistance", and so J. W. B. Maclaren of Swan & Maclaren, then the "only competent architect who remained open to engagement", was hired to serve as his assistant and coadjutor for $300. The firm then submitted a claim for $1,200 in damages against Tan Jiak Kim. Tan claimed that there were "certain misunderstandings" between him and Osborne and that he was not informed that the building had to be strengthened, and that he "had no reason to find fault with Joo Guan" for the collapse. At the inquest, the coroner, Thomas Crichton Mugliston, found that the builders "should have taken greater precautions" and that the work should have been overseen by a "skilled architect" as the structure was of an "unusually difficult type to build". It was ruled that the collapse was caused by "faults of construction on the part of the builder". Peck and Joo Guan, were found guilty of a "rash and negligent act" as they had failed to report a cracked arch to the authorities, though the latter was later acquitted. Municipal Inspector J. Lammers was also "severely censured for the careless manner in which he carried out his periodical inspections... and for his neglect of duty in not reporting deviations from the plans." However, the Pinang Gazette & Straits Chronicle noted that both Tan and his leading council were members of the Municipal Commission at the time, that the inquest was held without a jury, that Crane Brothers was represented by yet another municipal commissioner, and that Lermit, who could have given evidence "unfavourable" to Tan was not called on as a witness.

Following the collapse of the Chulia Street side, Osborne was put in charge of the project and since newspapers later credited Osborne as the architect, surveyor William Jones wrote that his designs "superseded those of Lermit." Work on the building went on under the supervision of Osborne, and when Osborne retired to England, Swan & Maclaren architect Regent Alfred John Bidwell was put in charge of overseeing the remainder of the work. Riley Hargreaves & Co served as the contractors. Construction on the Chulia Street frontage had "practically to be recommenced." The municipal commissioners had ordered the installation of strengthening girders throughout the building, though before much of this was done Katz Brothers asked that this work be delayed until after the Kling Street front had been rebuilt, which Tan agreed to as a Mr. Bock, another tenant of the Boat Quay front, had also requested this, thus allowing Katz Brothers "facility to carry on their work." By June 1896, scaffolding had already been removed part of the building, though the collapsed portion was scheduled to be complete only by 31 December in the following year. The project cost about $30,000. The Straits Times then reported that the building was "handsome and commodious" and it was already "one of the finest and most imposing in Singapore." In December, the tailoring department held its 14 day-long annual clearance sale with "phenomenally low prices" in anticipation of the store's relocation to the ground floor of the new building.

=== Opening and disputes ===
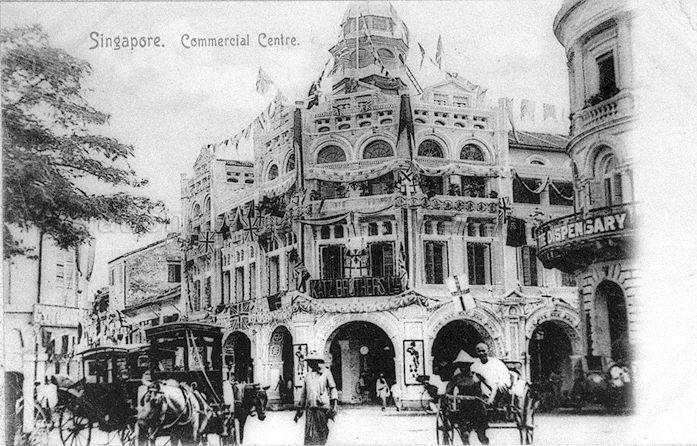
The Bonham Building, decorated for the 1907 visit of the Duke and Duchess of Connaught.

The premises of Katz Brothers was officially opened on 27 March 1897, accompanied by a "housewarming" open to the public. The Straits Times considered the structure to be "at once a credit to the town and an indication of progress and prosperity", being "eminently suitable for the purpose for which it was designed". The newspaper felt that the structure had been "admirably adapted to its use" and commended the firm's displayal of "generosity and originality in considering the requirements of the public." Later that year, the same paper proclaimed that a "more imposing block of buildings certainly [did] not exist in the Straits", and that the arrangement of the interior was "wonderfully attractive and convenient." However, the writer John Dill Ross instead felt that the building was "bizarre" and "hideous", worsened by "sickening scheme of colouring which [rendered] it painfully obvious." Jane Beamish retrospectively opined that the "fanciful and ornate" structure reflected the "idiosyncratic flamboyance" of the "ruling architectural style of the period." The building was amongst the earliest in the country to be fitted with lifts and lavatories. In June, for the Diamond Jubilee of Queen Victoria, it was decorated with flags, shields, lanterns and Venetian masts which "[showed] up to advantage the fine proportions of the building."

With the completion of the Kling Street front, the installation of the girders commenced. However, Katz Brothers then told Riley Hargreaves & Co. that if they continued on with the work, which was to take place in the shop, they would be "treated as trespassers." The Municipal Commission and Tan separately ordered that the work commence in September, though Katz Brothers refused to relent unless Tan agreed to stop collecting rent during the works. This was in spite there also being reports of leakage. Tan refused to negotiate a reduction in rent following Katz Brothers' threat, then issued a summons against the firm in October. The store claimed that the work had "put them to very serious inconvenience", with goods having been damaged by falling ladders, and that they had never "physically prevented" the contractors from installing the girders. Riley Hargreaves & Co then stated that they had already installed five of the seven girders, and that the building was in "no danger" assuming that the floors would not be "loaded beyond what they [then were]." The court ruled that, as the commission had made an order, obstructing the work amounted to "prevention" and that Katz Brothers were to pay the cost of the summons, though the judge suggested that Tan delay the works until after the next Chinese New Year as starting immediately would "greatly inconvenience" the firm's business.

In January 1898, Katz Brothers filed a suit against Chia Keow & Co. for "negligence" in the installation of a skylight to the roof of the building, resulting in rainwater leaking through and damaging the store's goods. During the installation, which took place in July the previous year, a temporary attap and wood cover was constructed over the portion of the roof which had been opened up. This was not enough to withstand the "violent squall and heavy rain" which came on 15 July, leading to a severe leakage which damaged several goods, found to be worth around $2,600 in total. These had to be auctioned off for about $1,107. Katz Brothers sought the difference in damages in addition to $50 in surveyors' fees, and the judge ruled in their favour. In November 1899, the firm was ordered by the President of the Municipal Commission to clear the goods they had been storing in the building's verandah way. Grocer Frederick S. Pooles moved his store into the building in that year. The Singapore offices of grocers Joseph Travers & Sons moved into 8 Boat Quay by 1900, and this firm acquired Pooles's business in June 1905. They firm remained in the building for about six years before relocating to 7 d'Almeida Street in March 1906. The offices of the Singapore Steam Saw Mill, a venture of Towkay Choa Giang Thye, as well as Giang Bros., moved into the first floor of 31 Kling Street in early 1902. The dome was struck by lightining and "wrecked" in July 1905. Several tiles on the roof were smashed and a piece of scorched wood was flung through a window of the building across Bonham Street. The crowd that gathered around after the storm collected pieces of the debris as "souvenirs" or "charms." By January 1909, Wong Ah Fook's offices were located at 31 Kling Street.

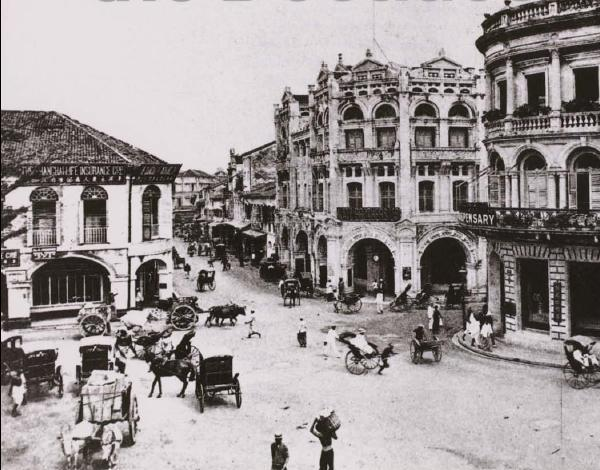
The Katz Brothers store from Raffles Place in 1902. Also visible are 1 Raffles Place (left) and the Dispensary Building (right).

The Straits Times retrospectively reported that this store was "never prosperous" as it was situated "on the wrong side of Raffles Place" and that for "some curious reason people were not willing to cross over to do their shopping." Valli Subramony of the Straits Times reported in 1989 that the store suffered from a "difficulty in getting stocks." The Free Press reported in January 1908 that Katz Brothers had leased the plots of land in between the Powell & Co. Building and the Coghlan & Co. Building from the Portuguese Mission of Macau with the intent of clearing the site, then occupied by a "rather poor looking row" of godowns, and erecting a new block to serve as their premises. The foundations for this were laid by December 1910 and it was expected that the store would relocate to the new building in a year and a half. The building, which eventually came to be known as Raffles Chambers, was ready for occupation by April 1912 and Katz Brothers officially relocated there on 4 May, leaving the Chulia Street building vacant.

The Singapore branch of the Anglo-Swiss Condensed Milk Company moved their offices into 31 Kling Street in 1912, remaining there for two years, while solicitors Campbell & Bergsma, later Campbell & Layton, moved into 6-8 Boat Quay in early 1913. The offices of the Straits Advertising & Bill Posting Co. moved into the top floor at 6 Bonham Street in November. The Dispensary, previously located in the now soon-to-be-demolished Dispensary Building across Bonham Street, had also moved in by that month. The following year, Swan & Maclaren were commissioned to work on alterations to the building.

=== Banking hall and law firms ===
The Yokohama Specie Bank, a leading Japanese bank internationally, established a Singapore branch at the building on 5 September 1916. The Singapore offices of medicine vendor and manufacturer G. T. Fulford Company moved into 8 Bonham Street by March 1918. The G.H. Sweet Shop, which later became the G.H. Cafe, opened at 31 Kling Street in October 1920. The establishment gained a reputation as being "where the well-heeled had tea, businessmen hobnobbed and lawyers dined." It lasted there for only about two years before relocating to 6 Battery Road. Several law firms moved into the building in the 1920s and 1930s. Solicitors Aitken & Ong Siang moved their offices to 31-A Chulia Street by November 1923. Another law firm, Johannes & Sammy, moved in by November 1927. The offices of the law firm Aubrey Davies & Co., which had Tan Chye Cheng as an employee in the 1930s, moved in in 1929 while the practice of solicitor K. P. K. Menon moved in by 1933. The practices of Aloysius de Mello and Wee Swee Teow were housed in the building by 1934. Wee Chong Jin joined the latter's firm before his 1957 appointment to the Supreme Court of Singapore. Lawyer C. J. Koh moved his practice into the building by 1939. The partnership between M. Ismail and Sandy G. Pillay, as well as the practice of P. Y. Tan, had been established in the building by mid-1940.

The building was renamed the Bonham Building in 1928. One of the rooms above the bank had been converted into the new premises of the local Christian Science Reading Room in the middle of that year. This room also served as the premises of the Christian Science Society, the Singapore branch of The First Church of Christ, Scientist. By 1929, the building had been "recently renovated" with two new lifts installed. The Interport Company and the Singapore offices of the Nippon Mining Company moved in in that year. The Bintang Pranakan reported in 1930 that the property was then "occupied by many firms." In April 1931, Syed Ibrahim bin Omar Alsagoff acquired his family's business, Alsagoff & Co., styled as "General Merchants, Commission and Estate Agents", and moved its offices into the first floor of the Bonham Building. On 3 April 1933, the Yokohama Specie Bank relocated to the Meyer Chambers on Raffles Place. Australian importers R. E. Roe & Co. moved into 8 Bonham Street by July. Tenants that moved in by 1934 include the Straits Settlements branch of Bell's Asbestos and Engineering. In August 1935, the newly incorporated United Chinese Bank announced that it had secured a lease for the Bonham Building's corner at Chulia Street and Bonham Street. It was to temporarily occupy 100 and 102 Robinson Road before officially moving into the building on 1 October 1935. The founding of the bank, which was "already assured the support of influential Chinese", brought the total number of local Chinese banks to four, alongside the Oversea Chinese Bank, the Sze Hai Tong Bank and the Lee Wah Bank. Boxing promoter Arthur Edwards Beavis had established his office at the building by March 1938.

Singapore was invaded and subsequently occupied by the Japanese in February 1942, and it would remain under Japanese governance until September 1945. All five Chinese banks in Singapore at the time, including the United Chinese Bank, as well as the Ban Hin Lee Bank, which had established a Singapore branch, shuttered with the invasion. They were reopened in April with the "monetary aid of the Nippon military authorities." The building continued to serve as a centre for law firms in this period, while others, such as Aitken & Ong Siang, were put into "[control] by authority". The partnership of Fung & Tsan, later simply Tsan & Co., had moved in by August. In October, the Nippon-Go Training Institute, a Japanese-language school led by T. H. Lin, was established in the school. The Japanese-controlled Syonan Times claimed in December that the centre's "hundreds" of students included businessmen, merchants, clerks, civil servants, doctors and lawyers of "all races to be found in Syonan". There were then also plans to begin kanji lessons. The law firm Oehlers & Co. moved in the following year, as did retailer V. Mathi and an air raid shelter building firm. A. N. Mitra also had his legal practice in the building in this period. Shortly after the return of the British in September 1945, architect and appraiser Wong Puck Sham moved into the top floor. Architects Chan Kui Chuan and Ng Keng Siang moved into the building soon after. The Singapore Mercantile Co-operative Thrift & Loan Society moved in the following year. Union leader Lim Chuan Geok relocated his offices into the building in 1949. Law firms which moved in in the second half of the 1940s include the practices of Hugh A. R. Paulusz and John Pillai. The Singapore branch of the Indian Motion Picture Distributors' Association was housed in the Bonham Building in the 1950s before relocating to Shaw's Building. The offices of the firm Abisheganaden & Lai moved in in the late 1950s.

Allen & Gledhill lawyer Victor Rudolph Grosse later recounted that in the 1950s, the building had become known for housing "struggling" law firms and lawyers who "were not earning very much", known as the "Bonham Building lawyers". These firms could not afford the rent in the other bank buildings on Raffles Place or in buildings such as the John Little Building, and as such instead occupied the smaller offices of the Bonham Building, where the rent was cheaper. Lawyers who practiced there were perceived as "not earning very much" or not very competent. Felix Chia of the Straits Times instead reported that these lawyers and their "lesser known" firms were commonly known as "Change Alley lawyers" due to the building's close proximity to Change Alley and for their tendency to bargain over fees "rather than lose a client", resulting in the building being recognised as a "notorious haven for bargaining". He further noted that these lawyers were reputed as being mediocre, and that even clients of lawyers who did not occupy the building leveraged the slang term against their lawyers after losing a case. Until the mid-1950s there were "more law firms there than could be found in other modern office buildings," resulting in the building being nicknamed the "centre for legal advice". Columnist T. F. Hwang wrote that "transport was never a problem" as one could "step out of [Bonham Building] into a waiting trisha", so much so that some lawyers "habitually took trishas to court."

=== Demolition and legacy ===
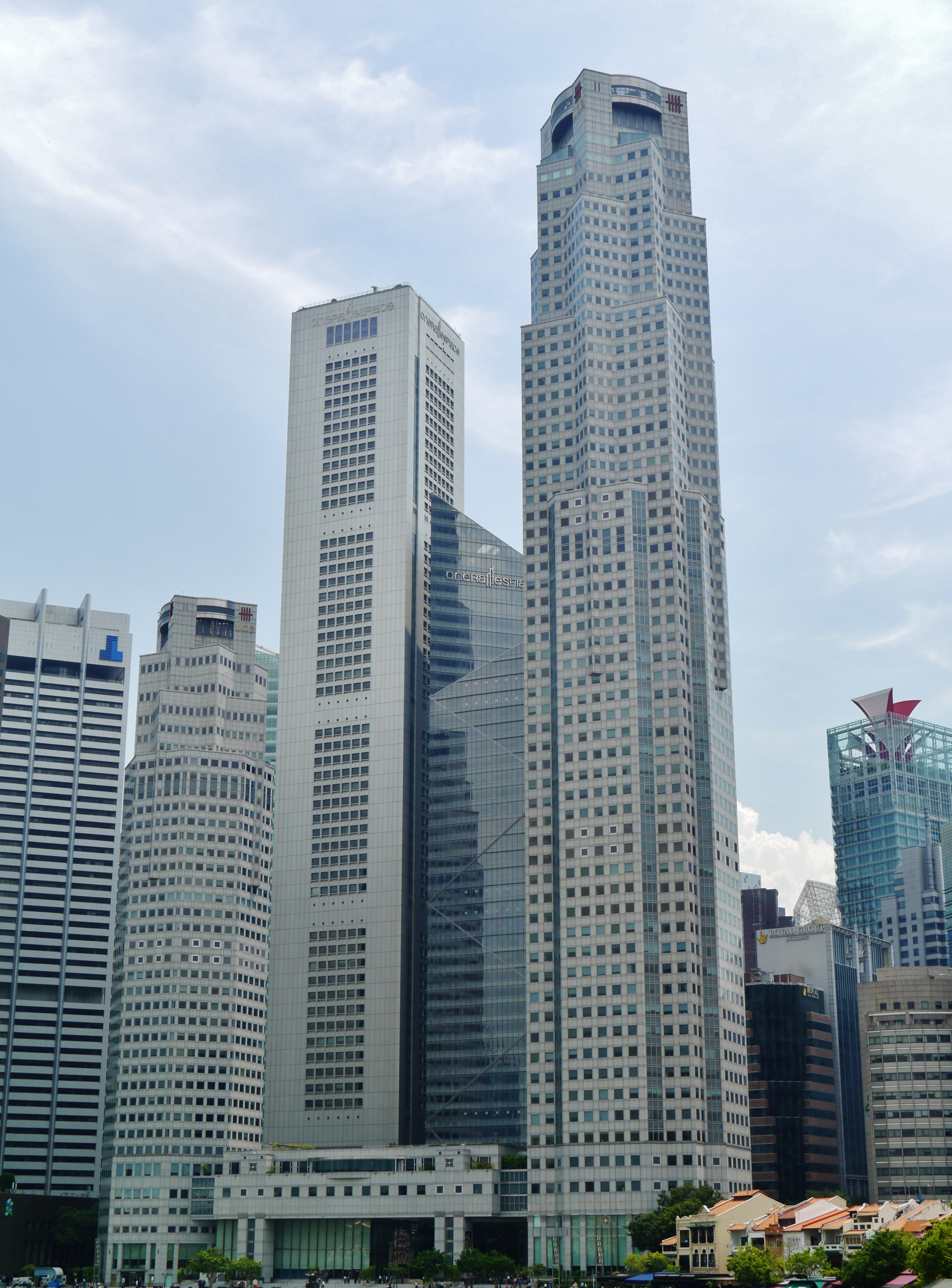
UOB Plaza in 2015.

The United Chinese Bank acquired the Bonham Building in 1963. The bank was renamed the United Overseas Bank in 1965. In August 1968, the bank announced its plans to pull down the building to make way for a 22-storey skyscraper to serve as its new premises. Neighbouring shophouses had also been acquired by the bank over time for this purpose. Demolition of Bonham Building and the adjacent shophouses had begun by the middle of 1970. The Straits Times reported that the decision "[left] the bankers at UOB nostalgic for they [claimed] it [was] with reluctance that they were pulling down their old building at Chulia Street". Hwang claimed that in its final years, the building "stood proudly as a landmark in a very old traditional trading centre of the city." Architect and lecturer Ian Y. H. Tan opined that the building serving as a banking hall for over five decades signified the structure's "adaptability" despite the "industry's rapid changes in services and technologies throughout the 20th century". He noted that the layout was "reconfigured to separate served and service spaces and to designate circulation for staff and public to optimise operational efficiency and security."

The skyscraper, initially known as the UOB Building, was completed in 1973. It was renamed UOB Plaza Two following the completion of a taller skyscraper named UOB Plaza One in 1995. On the official opening of the latter, then Senior Minister and former Prime Minister Lee Kuan Yew delivered a speech in which he called the Bonham Building "old", "decrepit" and a "nest for poor local law firms". Lee had previously practiced at the building as a lawyer. The location was officially designated an 'economic historic site' by the National Heritage Board in 1995. It was the fourth site to be designated as such after Clifford Pier, Raffles Place and the former Kallang Airport. As part of the bank's 80th anniversary, the skyscraper was "dressed up" as the Bonham Building.
