= Robert Ford =

Robert Ford may refer to:

== Politics ==
- Robert Ford (politician) (born 1948), member of the South Carolina Senate
- Robert MacDonald Ford (1911–2004), Washington state politician
- Rob Ford (1969–2016), former mayor of Toronto
- Robert Ford (academic) (fl. 2010s–2020s), British political scientist

== Sports ==
- Bob Ford (basketball) (born 1950), American basketball player
- Bob Ford (American football) (born 1937), American football coach
- Bob Ford (golfer) (born 1954), American golfer, see Pennsylvania Open Championship
- Bobby Ford (born 1974), English footballer
- Bobby Ford (Scottish footballer) (born 1949), played for Dundee FC
- Robert Ford (sportscaster), American sportscaster for the Houston Astros
- Robert Ford (American football) (born 1951), American football coach
- Robert Ford (basketball) (fl. 2000s–2020s), American basketball head coach
- Robert Ford (runner) (born 1996), American middle-distance runner, 2018 All-American for the USC Trojans track and field team

== Characters ==
- Robert Ford (One Life to Live), a fictional soap opera character
- Robert Ford, character in the TV series Westworld

== Others ==
- Robert Ford (outlaw) (1862–1892), the man who killed Jesse James
- Robert Ford (Canadian diplomat) (1915–1998), poet and Canadian diplomat
- Robert Ford Jr. (1949–2020), American journalist and record producer
- Robert Stephen Ford (born 1958), former American ambassador to Syria and former ambassador to Algeria
- Robert W. Ford (1923–2013), British radio officer and civil servant in Tibet
- Robert Ford (British Army officer) (1923–2015), adjutant-general to the Forces in the United Kingdom
- Robert B. Ford, president/COO at Abbott Laboratories Inc, CEO since 2020.

== See also ==
- Robert Forde (1875–1959), explorer
- Robert Michael Forde (1861–1948), colonial surgeon in The Gambia
