= Urban Pritchard =

British otologist (1845–1925)

- Born: 21 March 1845
- Died: 1925 (aged 79–80)
- Occupation: Otologist
- Known for: Organ of Corti description

Urban Pritchard (21 March 1845 – 1925) was a British otologist who made important contributions to understanding of the organ of Corti.

== Early years ==
Urban Pritchard was born on 21 March 1845. He was the fifth son of Andrew Pritchard, a Fellow of the Royal Society. He studied medicine at King's College Hospital, qualifying as Member of the Royal College of Surgeons in 1868 and Licentiate of the Royal College of Physicians and of the Society of Apothecaries in 1869. He went on to the University of Edinburgh where he was Ettles Scholar. He graduated as Bachelor of Medicine, Bachelor of Surgery in 1869 and Doctor of Medicine in 1871. His thesis, which earned a gold medal, was entitled Researches on the Structure of the Lamina Spiralis Membranacca, with a supplementary chapter on the Staining of Tissues. In 1872 he obtained a diploma as Fellow of the Royal College of Surgeons.

== Career ==
Pritchard returned to King's College Hospital and was physicians' assistant to Sir George Johnson, Dr. Lionel Beale and Sir Alfred Garrod. He was later appointed surgical registrar and curator of the museum. In September 1872 he was appointed demonstrator of Practical Physiology at King's College London. He was also appointed lecturer on physiology for evening classes at King's College. At the same time, he was researching the structure of the ear, and the organ of Corti in particular. He continued to research and publish papers until 1881, after which he devoted himself to clinical work and to his extensive private practice. In 1874 he was appointed surgeon of the Royal Ear Hospital, holding this position until 1900, when he stepped down and became consulting surgeon. In 1876 he was appointed aural surgeon at King's College Hospital, holding this position until 1910. On his retirement he was succeeded by Arthur Henry Cheatle.

In 1886 Pritchard was appointed professor of aural surgery in King's College, the first to hold this position. In 1893 he was made a Fellow of King's College. From 1884 to 1922 he was the main British representative on the organizing committee of the International Congress of Otology, and in 1899 was elected President of this society when it held its meeting in London. He was in 1901–1903 the second President of the Otological Society of the United Kingdom, which in 1907 became the Otological Section of the Royal Society of Medicine. From 1890 to 1908 he co-edited the International Archives of Otology.

Pritchard married Charlotte Pallister, the daughter of Blade Pallister, in 1872. He died in 1925 at the age of 80. He was survived by his wife, one daughter and two sons.

== Research ==
Pritchard had to use relatively primitive techniques to prepare histological sections for microscopic examination, but became widely known for the quality of this work. He published four papers on his research into the organ of Corti between 1876 and 1881. The first was read before the Royal Society, where he was introduced by Professor Thomas Henry Huxley, and published in the society's Proceedings of 1876. This paper reported the results of examinations of the cochleas of various mammals including man, monkey, sheep, dog, cat, rabbit, porpoise and kangaroo. In it he supported the views of Hermann von Helmholtz, with some reservations. His last paper described the presence of the lagena in the platypus, which is also found in birds. He saw this organ as a link between the cochlea of higher and lower vertebrates. In the British Medical Journal of January 1880 he reported the preliminary results of an early hearing aid.

== Bibliography ==
- Pritchard, Urban (1873). On the Structure and Function of the Rods of the Cochlea in Man and Other Mammals. William Clowes & Son.
- Pritchard, Urban (1876). The Termination of the Nerves in the Vestibule and Semicircular Canals of Mammals: Read Before the British Association, Glasgow, September, 1876.
- Pritchard, Urban (1878). "Development of the organ of Corti". Journal of Anatomy and Physiology. 13 (Pt 1): 99–103. PMC 1309901. PMID 17231237.
- Pritchard, Urban (1881). The Cochlea of the Ornithorhynchus Platypus Compared with that of Ordinary Mammals and of Birds.
- Pritchard, Urban (1886). Handbook of diseases of the ear for the use of students and practitioners. P. Blakiston.
- Pritchard, Urban (1896). Handbook of Diseases of the Car. Lewis.
- Pritchard, Urban; Cheatle, Arthur (1898). The Onset of Inherited Syphilitic Deafness. Knickerbocker Press.
