= Royal Society of Medicine =

Learned society devoted to medical science in the United Kingdom

Coordinates: 51.5161°N 0.1471°W

- Royal Society of Medicine
- RSM logo and wordmark

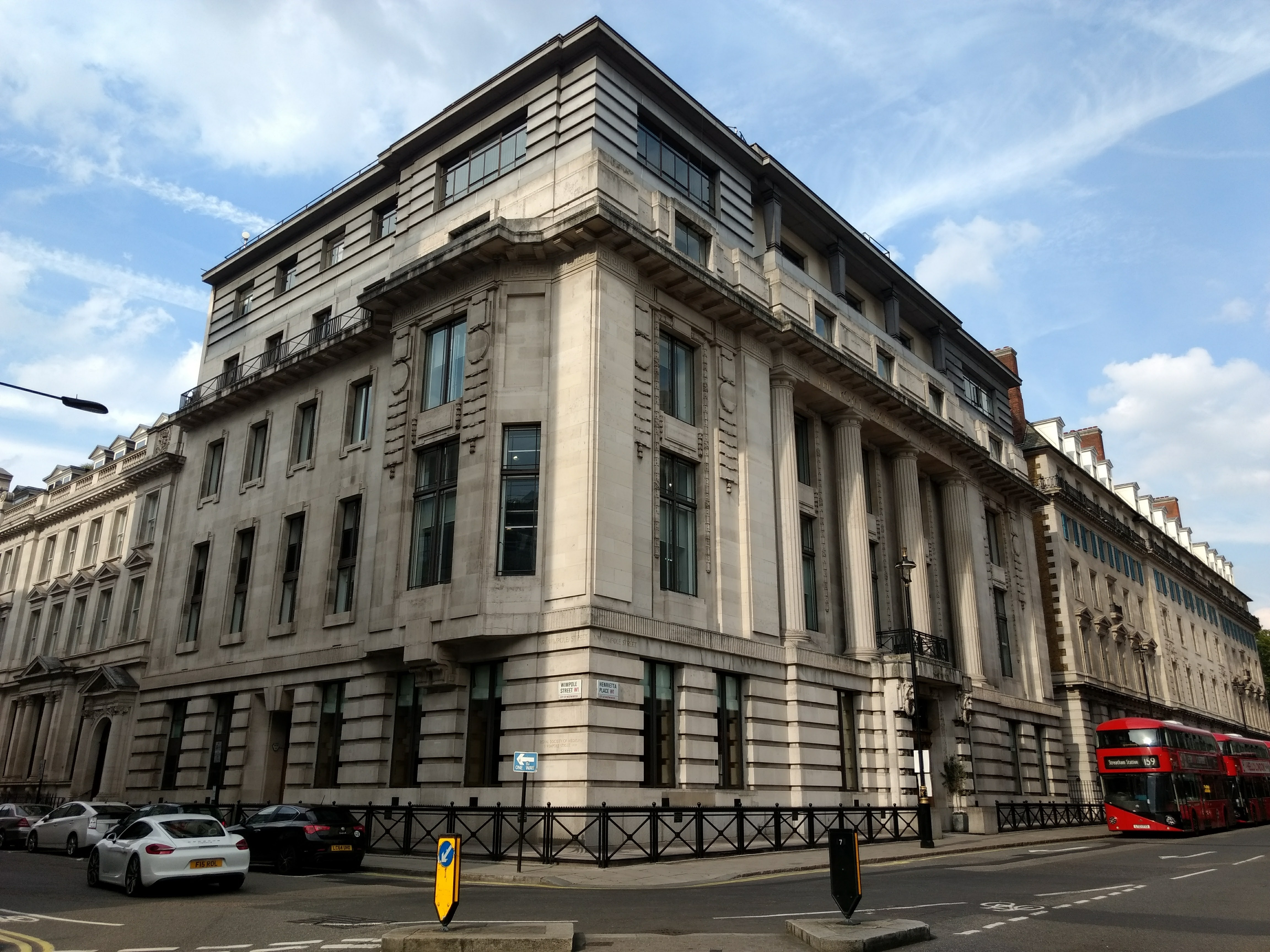
- Abbreviation: RSM
- Formation: 1907
- Headquarters: 1 Wimpole Street, London
- Location: UK
- President: Gillian Leng
- Awards: Edward Jenner Medal; Edwin Stevens Lecture; Ellison–Cliffe Lecture
- Website: www.rsm.ac.uk
- Formerly called: Royal Medical and Chirurgical Society of London

The Royal Society of Medicine (RSM) is a medical society and registered charity based at 1 Wimpole Street, London, UK. It also functions as a members club for its membership.

== History ==
The Royal Society of Medicine (RSM) was formed in 1907 when 17 individual medical societies merged with the Royal Medical and Chirurgical Society of London (RMCS), reflecting the growing acceptance of medical specialties at that time. Key figures in its founding included John MacAlister, the resident librarian at the RMCS since 1886, and his supporters Sir Richard Douglas Powell, Sir William Selby Church and Sir William Osler. (Note: Osler donated £500 to the building funds in 1910.)

=== 19th century ===
Although the Society became the RSM in 1907, it is generally accepted by its historians that the origins date back to 1805, when John Yelloly, Alexander Marcet and William Saunders left the Medical Society of London (MSL) as a protest against its president James Sims, and created the Medical and Chirurgical Society of London. The history can be further traced back to the creation of the MSL in 1773, and as far back as 1660 with the formation of the Royal Society.

At its first meeting at Gray's Inn, it was decided that the president would hold office for two years, and membership would be by nomination and election with an initial admission fee and then annual subscription. This was to avoid a repeat of what had happened at the MSL with the autocratic Sims holding office for over 20 years. Politics, it was decided, was to strictly be kept out of any agenda. One of the earliest members to join was Edward Jenner. (Note: Jenner had not long before been awarded the MSL's Fothergillian gold medal.) Sir David Dundas, James Parkinson, John Haighton, Everard Home, and Richard Croft, were among those invited to be members without election. Honorary membership was created for leading scientists not necessarily from the medical field; the first including Joseph Banks, John Aikin and Humphry Davy. From 1810 to 1819 the Society met at 3 Lincoln's Inn Fields before transferring to 57 Lincolns Inn Fields, where it stayed from 1820 to 1834. In 1834 it received a Royal Charter by King William IV, became the Royal Medical and Chirurgical Society of London, and in the same year moved to 53 Berners Street, where it remained until moving to 20 Hanover Square in 1890. By 1891 the building there housed 16 separate medical societies.

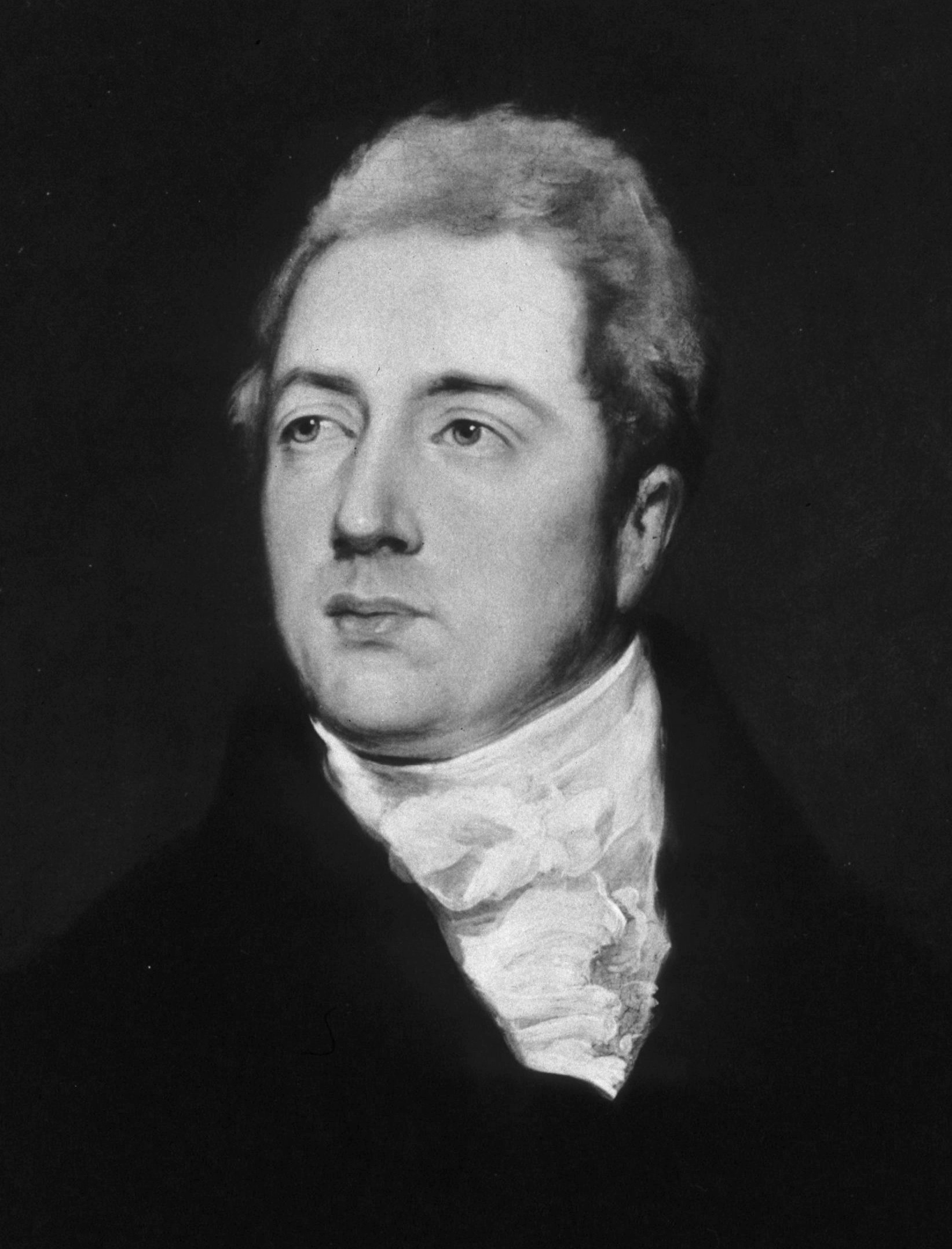
John Yelloly

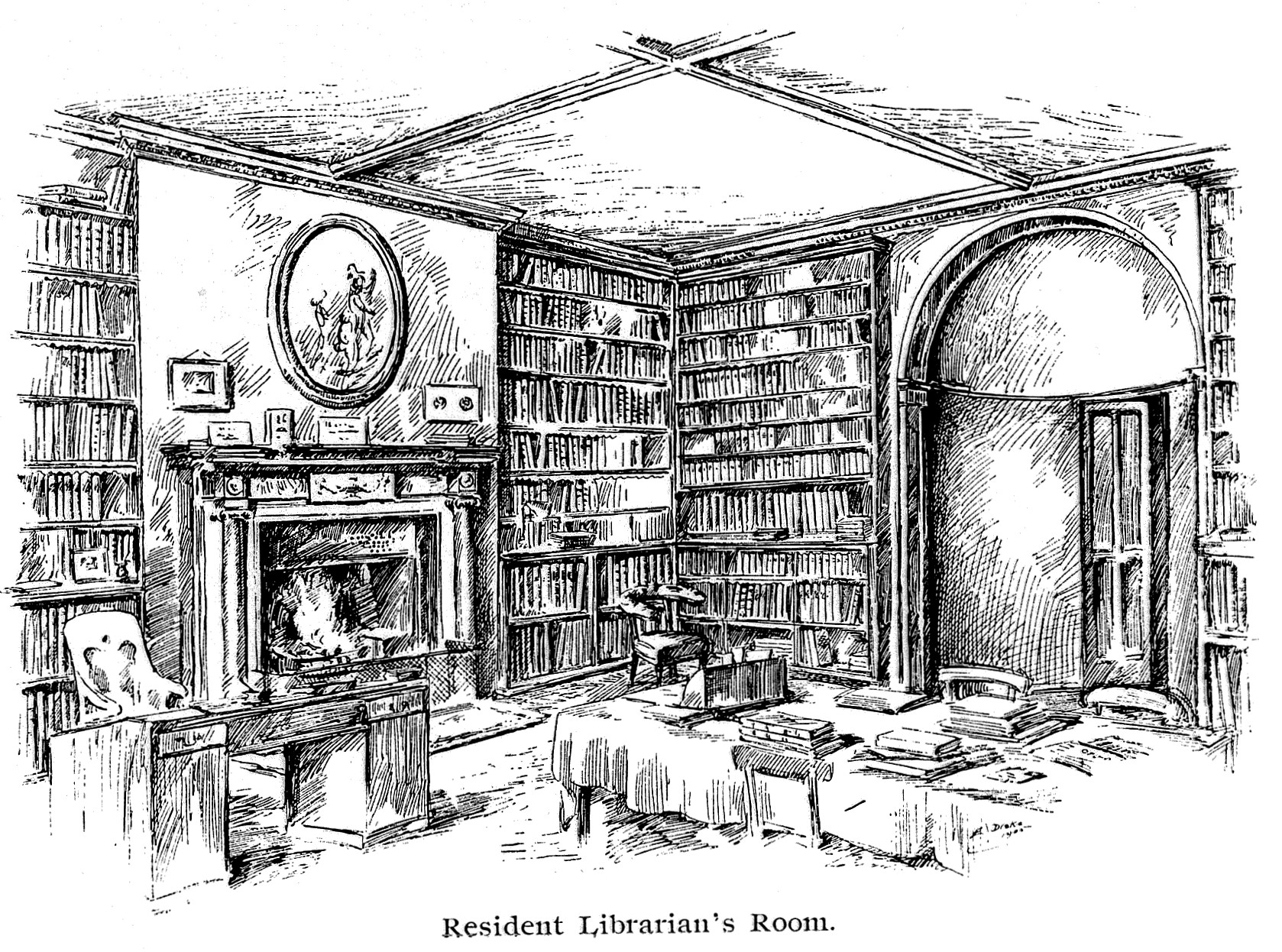
Librarian's room. 2 Verulam Buildings, Gray's Inn (1805–1810)

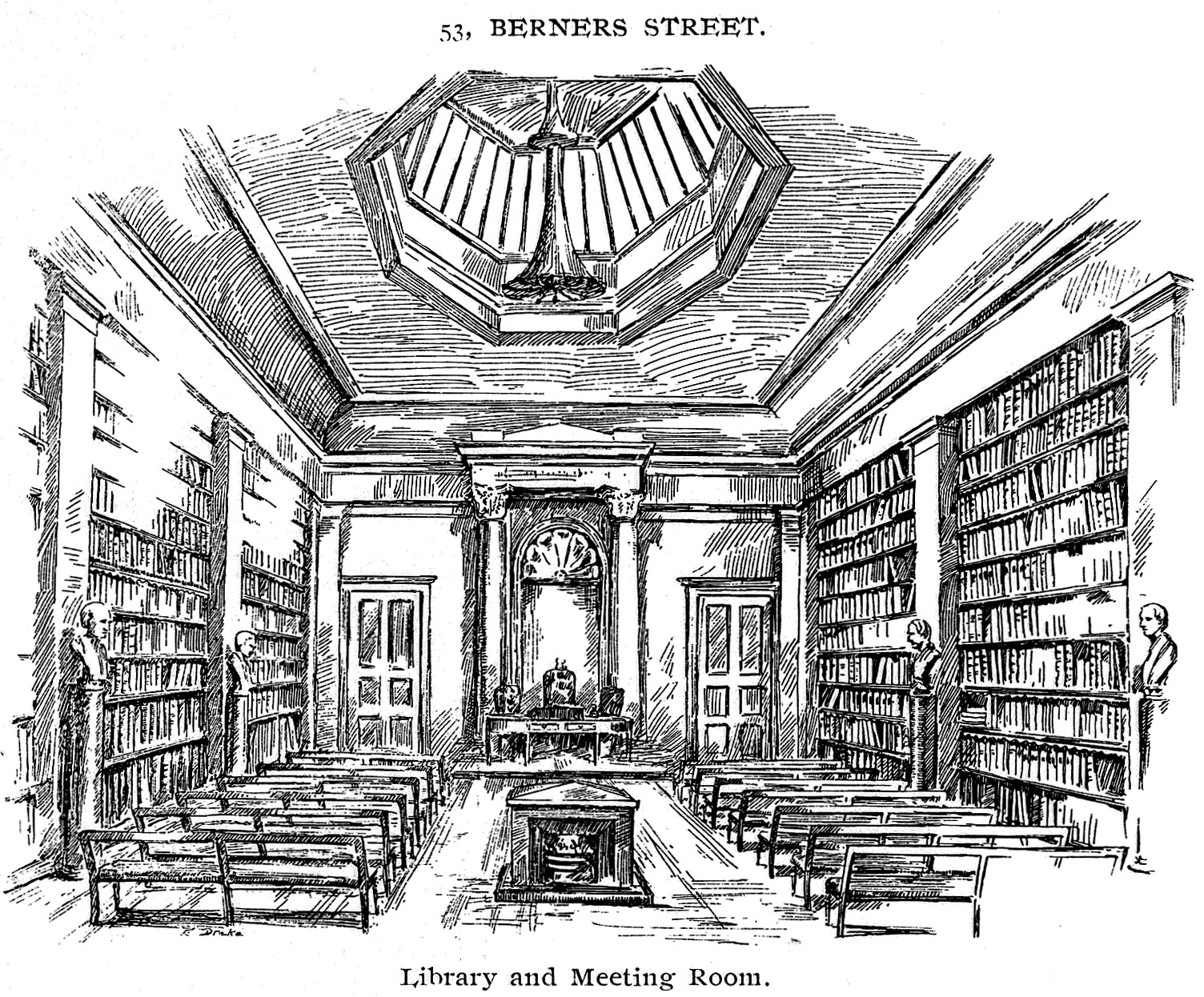
Library and Reading Room. Berners Street (1834–1890)

=== Early 20th century ===
In 1905, at his RMCS presidential address, Powell delivered an official proposal to form one co-ordinated central organisation consisting of sections that represented the varied specialties, each with its own council. The first president was Church. Under the leadership of MacAlister and Osler several medical societies merged with the RMCS of London to form the Royal Society of Medicine (RSM) in 1907, but the Medical Society of London remained separate. The Harveian Society and Hunterian Society were kept out as it was decided that these two societies served different purposes. New rules were adopted on 14 June 1907. One woman member, Mary Ann Dacomb Scharlieb of the obstetric and gynaecological section, was listed in the first council meeting.

Between 1907 and 1909, the 17 old societies that had merged, formed their corresponding speciality sections at the new RSM. The sections of medicine and surgery were created from the RMCS. The first general meeting was held on 14 June 1907 at Hanover Square.

The 17 societies that merged with the RMCS were:

- Society of Anaesthetists
- British Balneological and Climatology Society
- Clinical Society of London
- Dermatological Society of London
- Dermatological Society of Great Britain and Ireland
- Society for the Study of Diseases in Children
- British Electrotherapeutic Society
- Epidemiological Society of London
- British Gynaecological Society
- British Laryngological, Rhinological and Otological Association
- Laryngological Society of London
- Neurological Society of the United Kingdom
- Obstetrical Society of London
- Odontological Society of Great Britain
- Pathological Society of London
- Therapeutical Society

In 1910 the Society purchased 2-5 Henrietta Street, the site at the corner of Henrietta Place and Wimpole Street, which was opened by King George V and Queen Mary in May 1912. Until then, the Society met at 15 Cavendish Square, having moved out of Hanover Square two years earlier. The building at 1 Wimpole Street was designed by architects John Belcher and J. J. Joass. In the first nine months membership increased from 1,322 to 2,025.

It housed the Marcus Beck Laboratory, where animal experiments were carried out by Sir Ronald Ross. Ross, at the time living around the corner from the RSM, in Cavendish Square, applied to use the laboratory at the suggestion of McAlister in 1913. Some financial support was received from Sir Edwin Durning-Lawrence, and with assistance from Champneys, he was granted a licence to conduct animal experiments there. One of his activities was a survey of local children's spleens. His younger brother joined him at the laboratory in 1915. Ross resigned from the RSM in 1917.

The Emergency Surgical Aid Corps occupied the building during the First World War. In 1919, the Postgraduate Medical Association was created there.

=== Late 20th century ===
Chandos House was acquired in 1963 and later sold in 1986.

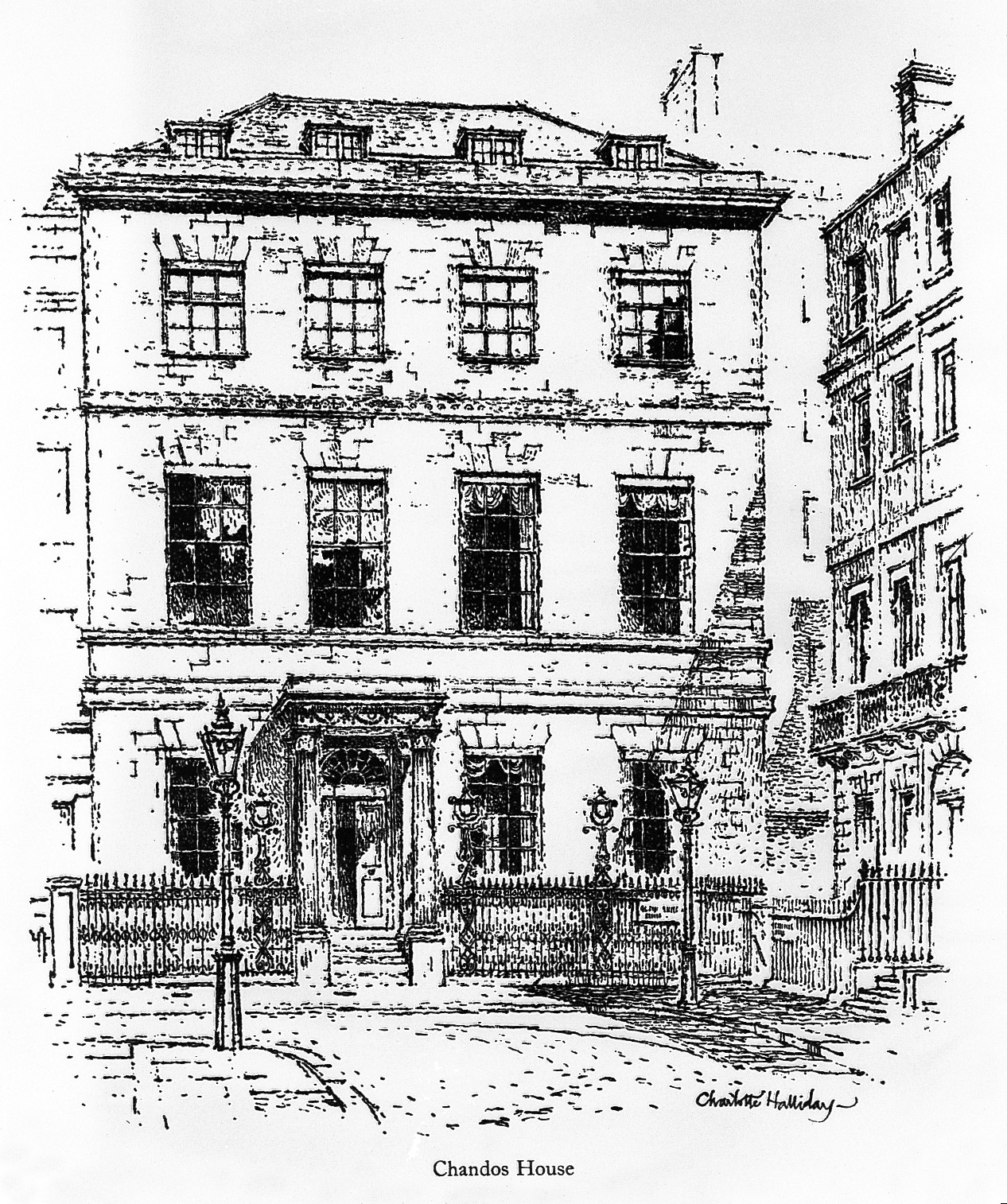
Chandos House

=== 21st century ===
In 2005, the building was redeveloped. The library and entrance was renovated, a lecture theatre for 300 people was built, and the atrium was created. Chandos House was re-acquired in 2002. The former building at Hanover Square was sold in 2001. By 2020, membership included around 35,000 healthcare professionals and physicians. The number of sections by this time numbered 58 and the Society was hosting around 400 events a year.

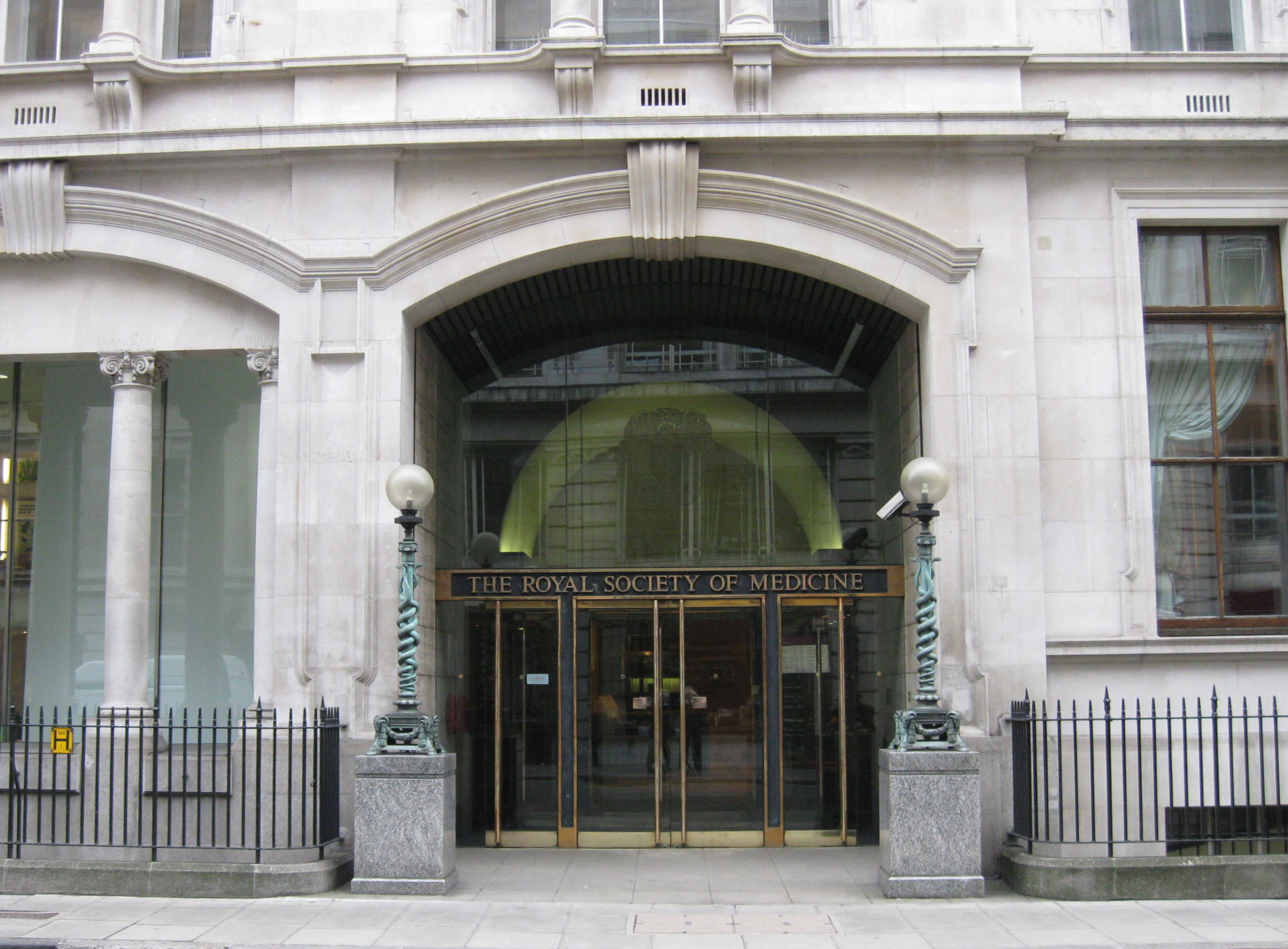
Entrance at Wimpole Street

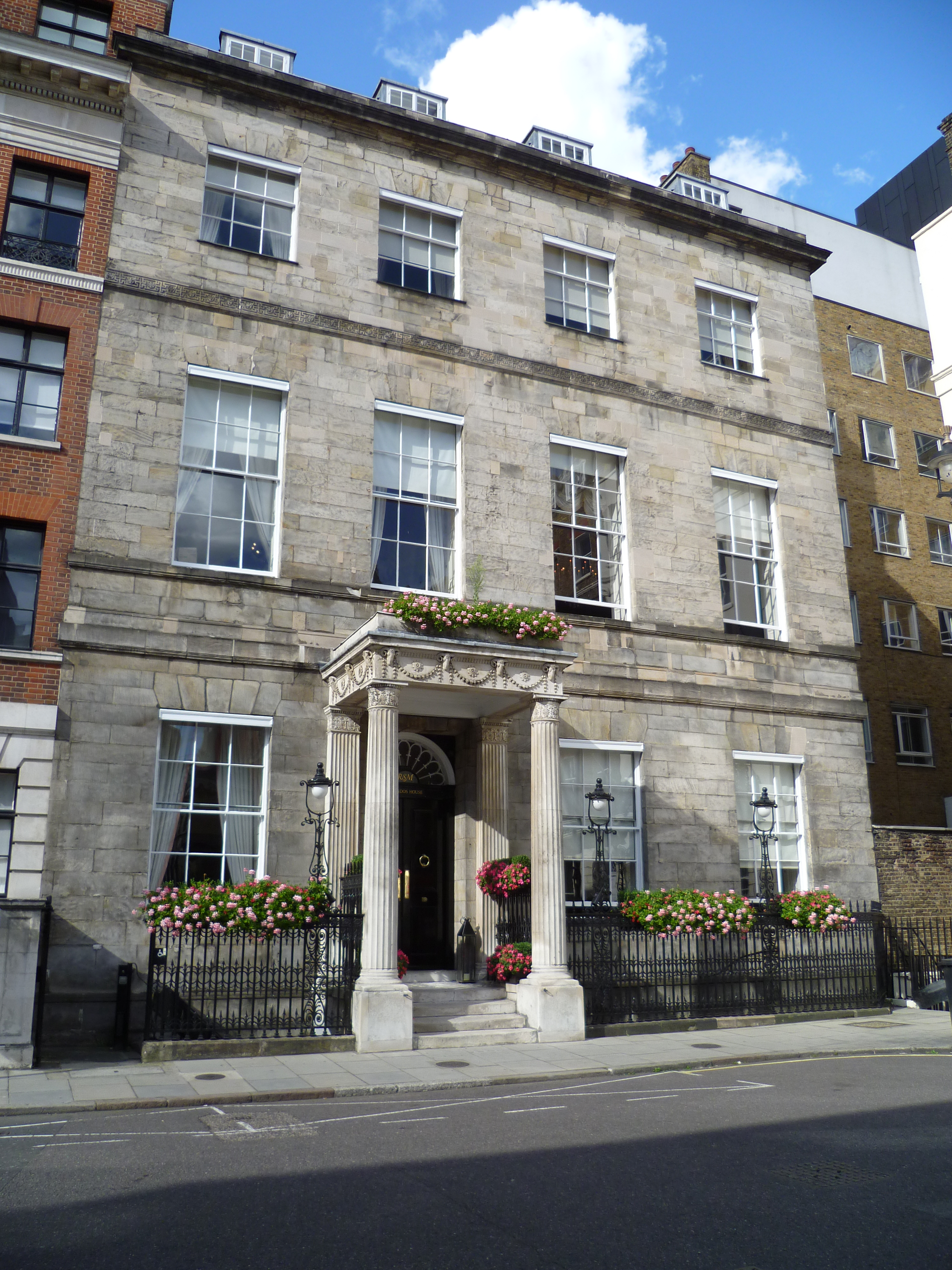
Chandos House

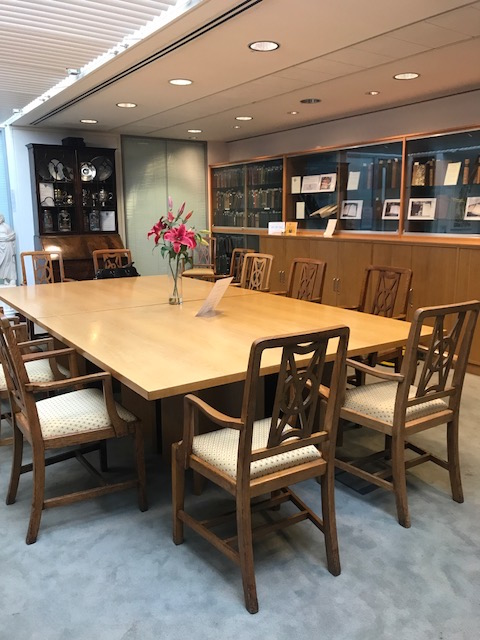
Heritage Centre

=== Historical accounts ===
The first history of the Society was published in 1905, at the request of Powell, 100 years after the creation of the Medical and Chirurgical Society of London. It was edited by Norman Moore and Stephen Paget and gave an account of how it was established for the "purpose of conversation on professional subjects, for the reception of communications and for the formation of a library". Maurice Davidson wrote a second history to cover the years 1905 to 1955, first published by Aberdeen University Press and later by the RSM, who also published a bicentenary account in 2002 authored by Penelope Hunting and edited mainly by the Society's History Section and other professional historians.

== Coat of arms ==
The coat of arms was designed by Martin Travers in 1927. The crest is made up of three all-heal sprigs. At the centre is the tau cross, frequently mistaken for the Rod of Asclepius. It represents healing. On either side are the Saints Cosmas and Damian, one holding a physician's medicine jar and the other a surgeon's knife. The physician stands on the green side of the crest and the surgeon to the red. Beneath is the motto "non-est vivere sed valere vita", as passed down from the RMCS, and translated to "it is important to enjoy good health to live fully".

== Library ==
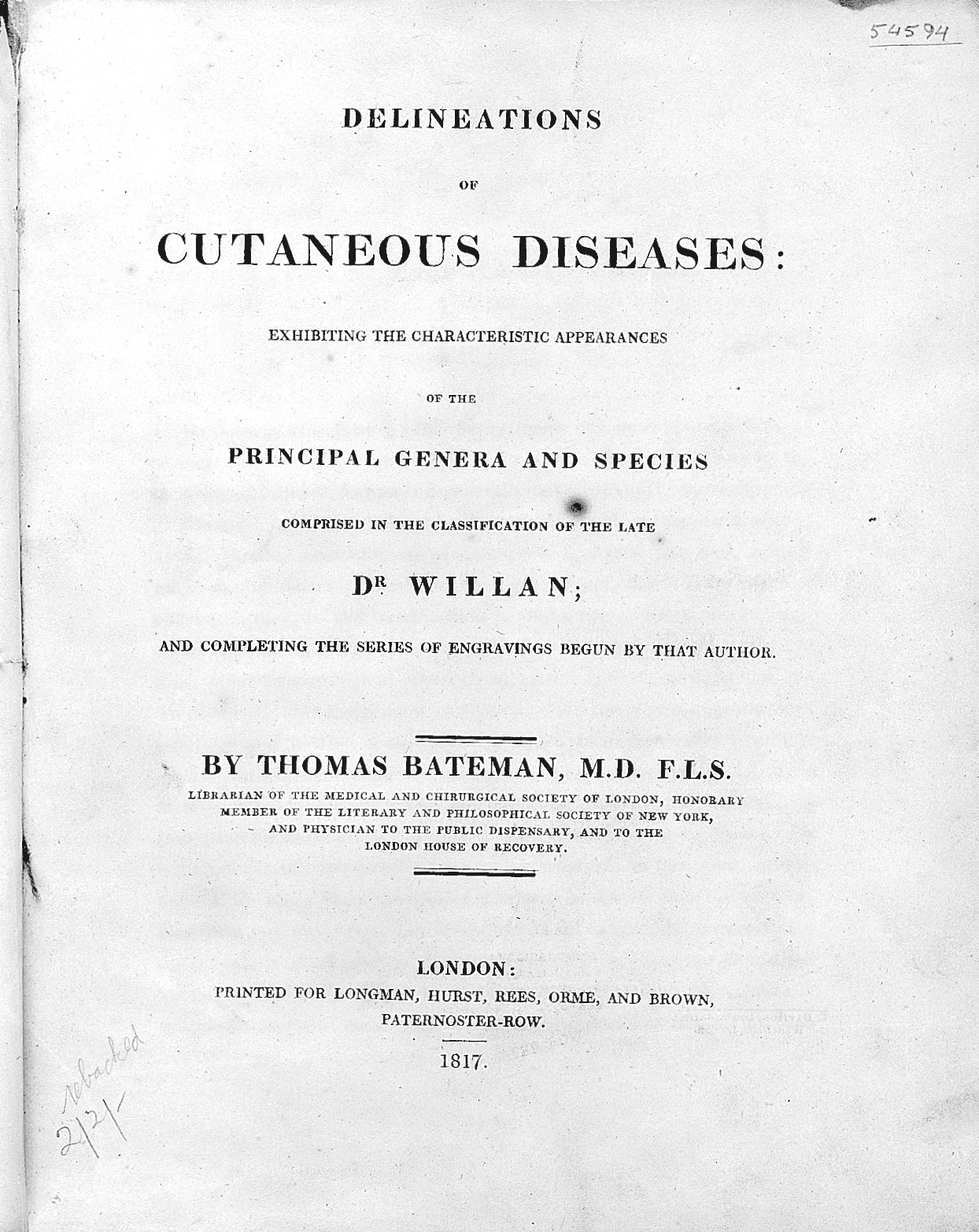
Bateman included his librarian title on the cover of his Delineations of Cutaneous Diseases (1817)

The RSM houses the fourth largest medical library in Europe, with a holding of circa 413,000 volumes. Its online resources can be accessed 24-hours a day by its members. Due to its historical library holdings, the RSM is a member of The London Museums of Health & Medicine group. The first edition of William Harvey's De Motu Cordis was donated to the library by Osler in 1917, and the historical collections also include Celsus's De Medicina, (1478) and Rosa Anglica (1495) by John of Gaddesden.

=== Early years ===
The library's origins can be traced to 1805 in the rooms at 2 Verulam Buildings, where it started with 35 books. In 1809, Peter Mark Roget took over the arrangement of the library and in 1812, then in Lincoln's Inn Fields, dermatologist Thomas Bateman, was appointed the newly created position of honorary librarian. Bateman completed the first library catalogue in 1816. After the move to 53 Berners Street, a formal library committee was created, which held its first meeting on 16 April 1836. Following complaints of discomfort and cold, gas lighting and two Arnott stoves were acquired in 1838. By 1855, the revised catalogue revealed that the library had been growing by around 500 volumes a year and now totalled 17,000 volumes. An interest in historical works by 1859 led to the purchase of a glazed bookcase, and the following year it was decided to keep duplicates of The British and Foreign Medical Review, The Cyclopadia of Anatomy and Physiology, The Lancet, The London Medical Gazette, and The Medical Times and Gazette. By 1868, the library held around 25,000 volumes. In 1874, it was decided that Bergeret's book The preventive obstacle; or, Conjugal onanism at first be restricted for loan and then ordered to be destroyed. The Councils minutes record that it was burned later that year. By 1879, the library housed around 31,000 volumes. MacAlister was appointed in 1887 and made the growth of the library the main reason for moving to the larger building at Hanover Square.

=== Library at 1 Wimpole Street ===
Between 1907 and 1909, the library incorporated the libraries of the other various societies that had merged with it, and it again became the focus when planning 1 Wimpole Street. The books of Albert Chalmers were received in 1921. The Marcus Beck Library, named for Marcus Beck, was created in 1924 as an extension to the main library for the purpose of storing historical works, and was converted from the former Marcus Beck Laboratory. (Note: The laborarotory was created in 1912 from a donation by Roger Beck of £500 to develop a research lab in his brother's name. During the First World War it was occupied by staff working in research for the War Office.) Roger Beck granted permission for the renovation on the agreement that it retain Marcus Beck's name. William John Bishop joined the library as sub-librarian in 1934.

With the assistance of a grant from the Rockefeller Foundation, around 40,000 books and journals were transferred out of London to a place in St. Albans during the Second World War.

== Sections ==
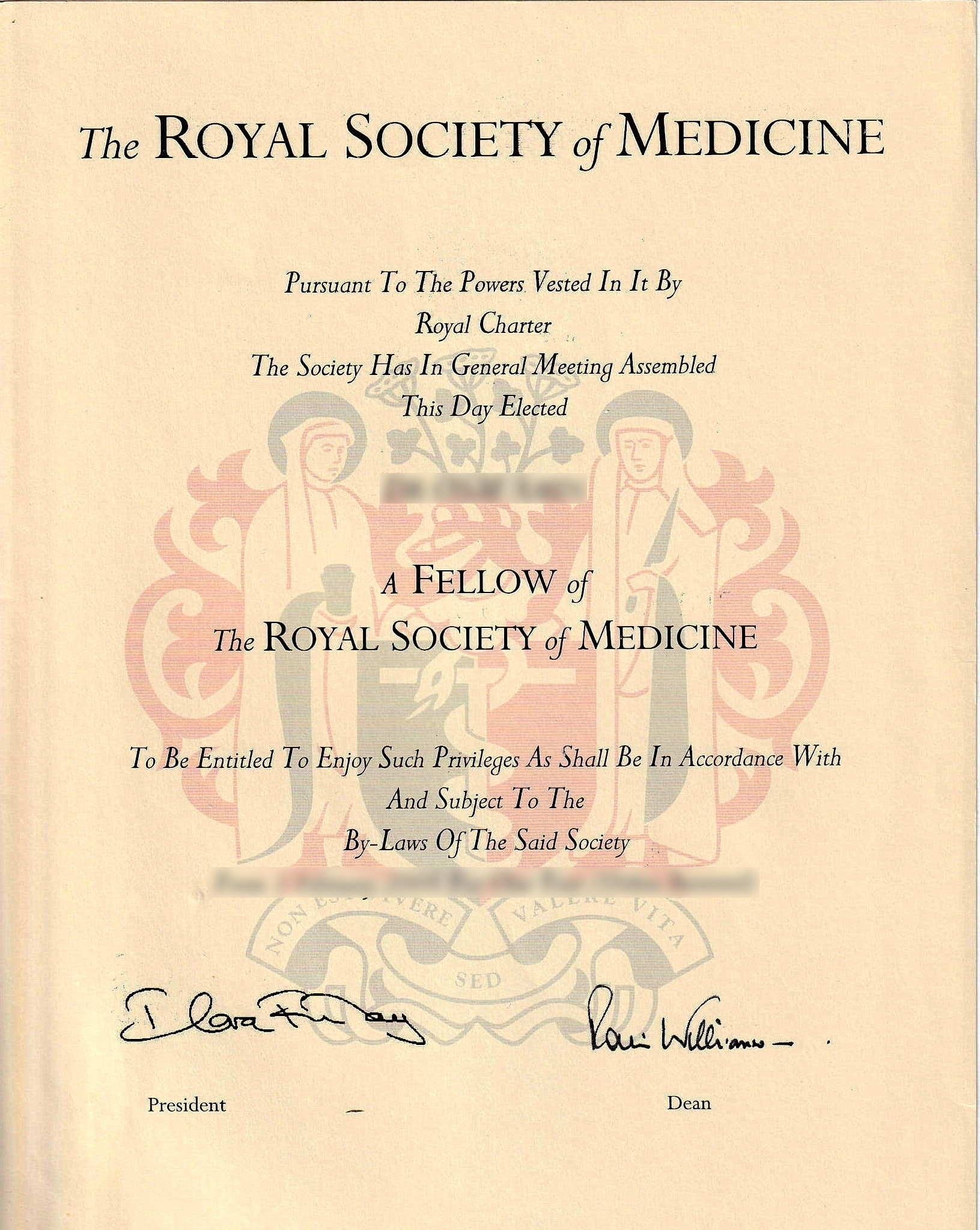
Fellowship of the Royal Society of Medicine in London, UK

The first 13 sections were formed directly from their corresponding society that had merged with the RMCS. Admission fees were waived for these section members and they were offered a RSM membership subscription or for a third of the cost, just the membership to their section. One of the first to merge was the Pathological Society of London which dissolved on 4 June 1907.

=== Anaesthesia ===
The Section of Anaesthetists of the RSM was created in 1908, when the Society of Anaesthetists, founded in 1893, joined the RMCS. The merge would have occurred in 1907, but it took to secure fellowship of its 13 women members. In 1995, Adrian Padfield, then the Section's president, proposed that its name was changed to the Section of Anaesthesia.

=== Dermatology ===
The Dermatology Section was created by the merger of the two founding dermatology societies. One was the Dermatological Society of London, founded in 1882. The other was the Dermatological Society of Great Britain and Ireland.

The specialties for skin disease and sexually transmitted disease were traditionally kept separate, although the subject matter had a significant commonality. (Note: The Archiv für Dermatologie and Syphilis was created in Germany in 1869, and by 1885 there was a combined section at the Versammlung der Deutschen Naturforscher und Ärzte. In England, the two specialties remained separate until many years later. It wasn't until 1917 that the British Journal of Dermatology and Syphilis was created.) The unpopular topic of venereology was not added to the section title, despite its many papers on syphilis. A call to change its name to that of Dermatology and Venereology Section was never followed up.

=== Ear, nose and throat ===
The ear surgeon Alfonso Cumberbatch insisted that otology (ear) be kept separate from rhinology (nose) and laryngology (throat). From the start, in 1907, the section for the ear was kept separate to the combined section for the nose and throat, although it was not unusual for them to all collaborate and membership to both was common. In the 1920s, both sections successfully petitioned for otolaryngology to be included in the medical curriculum. A diploma in otolaryngology, issued by the Royal Colleges, was shortly issued, and by 1938, the BMA specialist list recognised them as one category.

=== Epidemiology ===
The Section of Epidemiology traces its origin to the Epidemiological Society of London.

=== History of medicine ===
A section to cover history of medicine was created in 1912, with Osler as its first president. He turned down offers to be the president of the RSM in 1914 and in 1918, without giving any particular reason. Osler felt the section to be one of his most useful achievements during his life in England.

=== Odontology ===
The Odontology Section was created directly from the Odontological Society of Great Britain, which in 1863 had formed by the merger of the Odontological Society of London and the College of Dentists of England, both of which had been founded within a day of each other in 1856. (Note: The College of Dentists of England had little purpose after the Royal College of Surgeons of England began issuing the dental (LDS) degrees.) In 1907 they brought to the RSM around 370 new members, 5,000 volumes on dentistry and odontology, and around £5,000 of investments. It also brought with it its entire museum of 2,900 items, later transferred to the Royal College of Surgeons. Harold Mummery became the section's first president, and in 1945 the section elected its first female president, Lilian Lindsay.

=== Orthopaedics, proctology, and urology ===
In 1913, the urologist Edwin Hurry Fenwick asked Sir Francis Champneys, then the president of the RSM, to allow a section for the relatively new speciality of urology. It was included as a subsection in the Section of Surgery along with proctology and orthopaedics. In 1920, following the First World War, it became a full section. It appointed its first president as Peter Freyer. The Section of Orthopaedics traced its origin to 1894, when it was called the British Society of Orthopaedics. The Coloproctology Section, originally named Section of Proctology, traces its origin to December 1912 as the British Proctological Society, nine of its 15 founding members being staff of St Mark's Hospital included John Lockhart-Mummery. It held its first meeting in February 1913, at 1 Wimpole Street, and three months later became incorporated as a subsection of the Section of Surgery. A request to form a full section was made in 1921 by its president Sir Charles Gordon-Watson. In 1925, George Grey Turner's address "The relationship of proctology to greater medicine" to the sub-section was used as a charter in the petition for a full section, which was granted in 1939 following Lock-Hart Mummery's petition of 1938.

The Urology Section hosts regular meetings and awards.

== Awards ==
=== Gold Medal ===
The Society's Gold Medal was to at first be awarded on St Luke's day every three years for outstanding contribution to medicine; the first was received by Sir Almroth Wright in 1920. In 1947, two were awarded together, to Alexander Fleming and Howard Florey. Other recipients have included Wilfred Trotter in 1938. Noble laureate Sir Martin John Evans in 2009, Lord Walton of Detchant in 2014, Sir Michael Marmot in 2017, and Dame Sarah Gilbert in 2021.

=== Edward Jenner Medal ===
The Edward Jenner Medal was originally established in 1896 by the Epidemiological Society of London (1850–1907) to commemorate the centenary of Edward Jenner's discovery of a means of smallpox vaccination. It is awarded periodically by the RSM to individuals who have undertaken distinguished work in epidemiological research.

In 1912 the medal was awarded to Robert Daniel Lawrence, in 1925 to Sydney Copeman, and in 1981 to Richard Doll.

=== Ellison-Cliffe ===
The annual Ellison-Cliffe Travelling Fellowship of £15,000 is open to Fellows of the Royal Society of Medicine working in the UK or Ireland who are of specialist registrar or lecturer grade or equivalent or who are consultants within three years of their first consultant appointment. The Society hosts the annual Ellison-Cliffe Lecture concerning the advancement of medicine, along with the associated award of a medal.

=== Norah Schuster prize ===
The History of Medicine Society's Norah Schuster prize is awarded annually to one or more essays in the history of medicine.

== Journal of the Royal Society of Medicine ==
The Journal of the Royal Society of Medicine is published by SAGE Publishing, and is editorially independent from the Royal Society of Medicine.

== See also ==
- List of presidents of the Royal Society of Medicine
