= Arthur Henry Cheatle =

English surgeon (1866–1929)

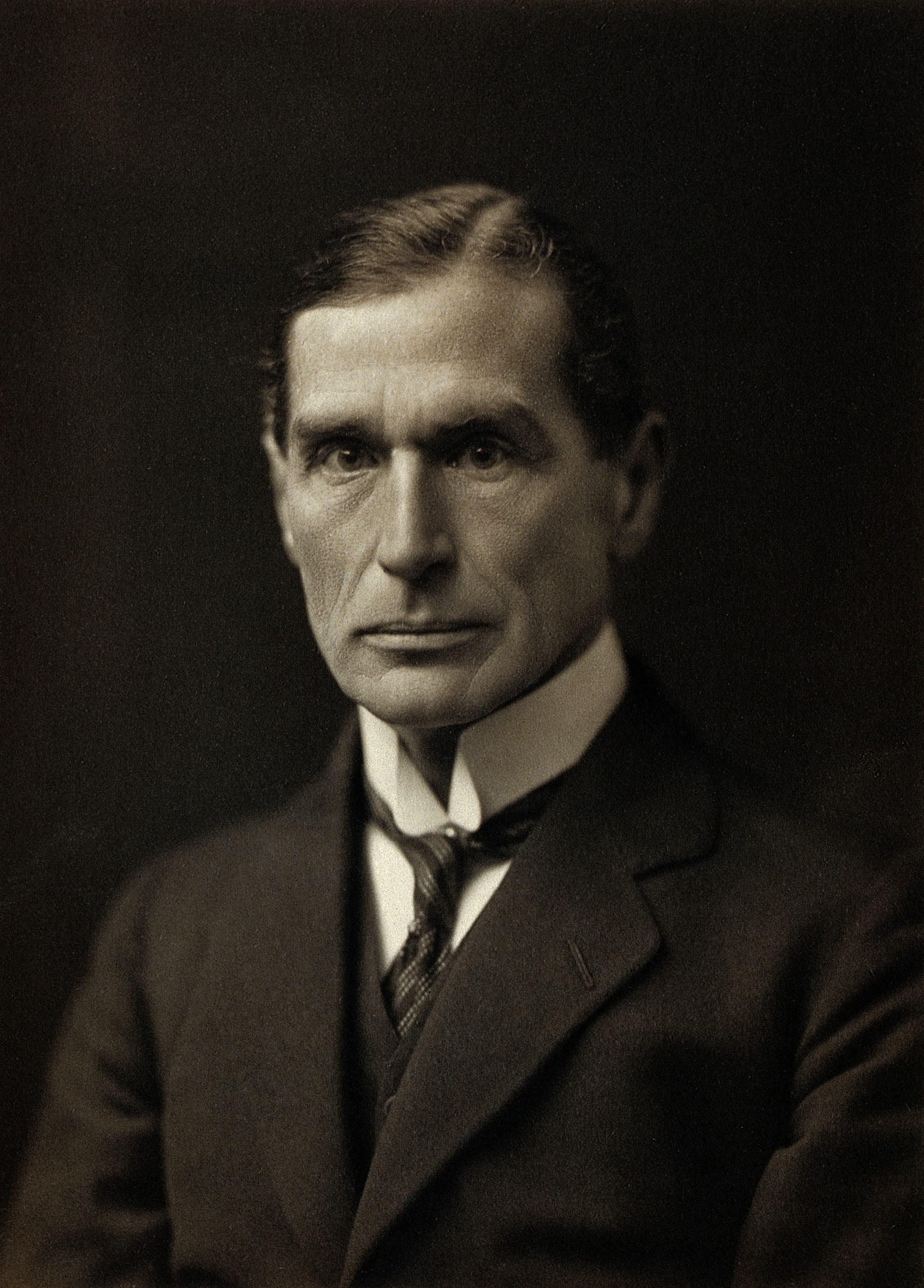
- Born: 4 December 1866
- Died: 11 May 1929 (aged 62); London
- Occupation: Surgeon
- Royal Air Force (medical branch)
- Branch: Royal Air Force
- Rank: Hon Lieutenant-Colonel
- Known for: Mastoid region specimens and description

Arthur Henry Cheatle CBE (4 December 1866 – 11 May 1929) was an English surgeon who made important contributions to understanding of the anatomy and diseases of the mastoid region.

== Early life and education ==
Arthur Henry Cheatle was born on 4 December 1866. He was a descendant of the parliamentarian William Lenthall. His family had settled in Burford, Oxfordshire in 1819. His father, George Cheatle, was a solicitor. His elder brother was Sir George Lenthal Cheatle, who also became a surgeon. Arthur Henry attended Merchant Taylor's School from 1876 to 1882, then studied at King's College Hospital and in Vienna. He suffered from a hearing defect that gradually became more acute, although it was not particularly noticeable to others. In 1888 he passed the examinations for Membership of the Royal College of Surgeons (MRCS).

== Career ==
Cheatle was House Surgeon at King's College Hospital under Sir Joseph Lister and then House Accoucher. In 1892 he became a Fellow of the Royal College of Surgeons. He went to Vienna for further studies on aural surgery, and on return to England was appointed assistant aural surgeon to Kings College Hospital. He became aural surgeon at the hospital when Urban Pritchard retired. In 1899, he co-founded the Otological Society of the United Kingdom, which merged with the Royal Society of Medicine in 1907 to form the Section of Otology, with the endorsement by Alfonso Cumberbatch.

In 1904, he was listed honorary medical staff at King Edward VII's Hospital for Officers. He taught otology at the Royal Army Medical College, and served as surgeon at the Royal Free Hospital. In 1906 he became Hunterian Professor of Surgery and Pathology at the Royal College of Surgeons, lecturing on the Surgical Anatomy of the Temporal Bone. During World War I (1914-1918) he was an officer in the Royal Air Force's medical branch and was Aural Surgeon to the King George V Hospital.

== Death ==
He died on 11 May 1929 in London from a vascular lesion. He was buried in Burford.

== Awards and achievements ==
Cheatle won the Adam Politzer Prize at the ninth Otological International Congress. He was mentioned in dispatches and was made a Commander of the Order of the British Empire for his war service. He made various discoveries in aural surgery for which he let others be credited, since he shunned publicity. He built an important collection of more than 700 specimens of the anatomy of the mastoid region, with a descriptive catalog, that he donated to the Royal College of Surgeons Museum in 1911 but continued to expand and update. The collection and catalog showed how variations in the temporal bone due to factors such as age and sex affected middle-ear infections. This work is the basis for modern understanding of the anatomy of the mastoid region.

== Bibliography ==
- Horne, Walter Jobson; Cheatle, Arthur Henry (1899). Descriptive Catalogue of the Museum of the Sixth International Otological Congress, Held in London, August 8th To 12th 1899. BiblioBazaar. ISBN 978-1-178-16832-7.
- Cheatle, Arthur H; Milligan, William (1901). Transactions of the Otological Society of the United Kingdom V2: Second Session, 1900-1901, with a List of Officers, Members, Etc. (1901). Kessinger Publishing. ISBN 978-1-165-14625-3.
- Cheatle, Arthur Henry (1907). Some points in the surgical anatomy of the temporal bone. J. & A. Churchill.
- Cheatle, Arthur Henry (1915). Guide to and Catalogue of Specimens Illustrating the Surgical Anatomy of the Temporal Bone, in the Museum of the Royal College of Surgeons of England. HardPress. ISBN 978-1-290-67999-2.
- Cheatle, Arthur Henry (1900). Photographs of specimens shown in the collection of lantern slides demonstrating the surgical anatomy of the temporal bone: with catalogue and guide. H. K. Lewis.
- Carter, Robert Brudenell; Cheatle, Arthur Henry (1919). Sight and hearing in childhood. Scientific Press.
