= Colonial Surgeon =

A Colonial Surgeon was a medical official in the British Empire. Colonial Surgeons were sometimes part of the government of British colonies, for instance in British Honduras where the Colonial Surgeon was a member of the Executive Council. Daniel Robertson was Colonial Secretary and Acting Governor of the Gambia in the mid-nineteenth century. Samuel Rowe was twice governor of Sierra Leone and held several other senior positions.

== List of Colonial Surgeons ==
- Peter Daniel Anthonisz (Southern Province, Sri Lanka)
- James Bowman (New South Wales)
- Albert John Chalmers (Gold Coast)
- Robert Michael Forde (Gambia)
- Samuel Hamilton (British Honduras)
- William Mayhew (Western Australia)
- Daniel Robertson (Gambia)
- Samuel Rowe (Gold Coast)
- Isaac Scott Nind (New South Wales)
- Robert Smith (Sierra Leone)
- John Macaulay Wilson (Sierra Leone)
- Thomas Crichton Mugliston (Singapore, Penang)

== See also ==
- Colonial Surgeon (South Australia)
- List of Indian Medical Service officers
