= Robert Ford (basketball) =

German basketball head coach

St. Xavier Cougars
- Position: Head coach
- Coaching career: 2011–present

Career history

Coaching
- 2011–2013: Texas A&M University–Commerce Lions (assistant)
- 2015–2017: Our Lady of the Lake University Saints (assistant)
- 2017–2018: Salem University Tigers (assistant)
- 2018–2021: Salem University Tigers (associate head coach)
- 2021–Present: St. Xavier Cougars

Robert Ford is an American basketball coach who is currently the head coach of St. Xavier Cougars of which was under the bracket NAIA.

== Coaching career ==
He began his coaching stint with Grand Rapids Christian High School back in 2005, serving as the assistant head coach for the team.

In 2019, after spending his first two seasons as assistant coach for the Salem University Tigers, he was duly promoted to be the head coach of the team.

On June 26, 2021, he left the Salem University Tigers for a head coaching job for St. Xavier Cougars.

== Head coaching record ==
As of March 29, 2022

Team	Year	G	W	L	W–L%	Result
Salem University Tigers	2018-19	26	18	8	.6923	
Salem University Tigers	2019-20	12	6	6	.5000	
St. Xavier Cougars	2021-22	32	17	15	.5313	
Career		70	41	29	.5857	
