= George Lenthal Cheatle =

British surgeon

- Born: 13 June 1865; Belvedere, Kent, England
- Died: 2 January 1951 (aged 85); London, England
- Occupation: Surgeon
- Known for: Breast cancer research and treatment

Sir George Lenthal Cheatle, KCB, CVO, FRCS (13 June 1865 – 2 January 1951) was a British surgeon who made important contributions to the diagnosis and treatment of breast cancer.

== Birth and education ==
George Lenthal Cheatle was born on 13 June 1865 in Belvedere, Kent, England. He was the eldest son of George Cheatle of Burford, Oxfordshire, and Mary Anne Cheatle, daughter of James Allen of Dartford Kent. His father was a solicitor. His younger brother, Arthur Henry Cheatle (4 December 1866 – 11 May 1929), also became a well-known surgeon. Their father died in 1872. George Lenthal Cheatle was educated at Merchant Taylors' School. He began his studies in the Medical department of King's College London in 1883. He graduated in 1887.

== Career ==
After graduating from King's College Cheatle's first appointment was Assistant Demonstrator of Anatomy. In 1888 Cheatle was appointed House Surgeon at King's College Hospital, and in 1889 was made House Physician and Sambrooke Surgical Registrar. From 1892 to 1894 he was a Demonstrator of Surgical Pathology, and in 1893 he was appointed Assistant Surgeon to King's College Hospital. He was trained as a surgeon by Sir Joseph Lister, and assisted Lister in his last operation.

Cheatle was a Consulting Surgeon to the army in South Africa during the Second Boer War (1899–1902). In 1900 he was appointed Surgeon and Teacher of Surgical Pathology at King's College Hospital. During World War I, in 1915 he was appointed Surgeon-Rear-Admiral in the Royal Navy. He served at the Royal Naval Hospital Haslar near Portsmouth and on a hospital ship in the Gallipoli Campaign. In 1919 he was made a Fellow of King's College London. He replaced Frederic Francis Burghard as Senior Surgeon and Lecturer of Surgery in 1923. At a special meeting of the Medical Board of the King's College Hospital Medical School held at Cheatle's house in Harley Street in February 1928, the Board recorded:

It was agreed by the unanimous vote of the twenty-four members of the Board present at this meeting that the Medical Board is of the opinion that the best interests of KCHMS will be served by not admitting women in the future.

Cheatle retired in 1930. He died on 3 January 1951 at his London home. He was aged 85.

== Work ==
Cheatle was deeply influenced by Lord Lister, and this showed up not only in his interest in research and close attention to detail, but also in his dress and physical mannerisms. However, although at first a strong supporter of Lister's antiseptic approach, he later was the first surgeon to use asepsis at King's.

In 1920 Cheatle was the first to repair an inguinofemoral hernia from above the pubis using the posterior preperitoneal space. The innovation received little attention at the time, and was not mentioned in his obituary. It was rediscovered in 1936 by A.K. Henry, but the Cheatle-Henry procedure for femoral and obturator hernias did not become widely used until after World War II. Today it is commonly called the Nyhus procedure after Lloyd Milton Nyhus.

Cheatle was interested in carcinomas throughout his career, and particularly cancer of the breast. Cheatle designed an exceptionally large microtome that could cut 10 inches (250 mm) square sections, with which his technician prepared whole-organ sections of the breast. Over a 35-year period he built a huge collection of normal and diseased breast sections. Using them, he was able to prove that Paget's disease of the breast was the result of an underlying breast cancer, and that the calls that are now called carcinoma in situ were not pre-cancerous or potentially cancerous, but were in fact already malign. He also showed that simple hyperplasia and Papillomas were not malign, as was generally thought, but were in fact benign. Based on his studies of whole-organ sections, Cheatle proposed that epithelial proliferation leading to cancer had lobular rather than ductal origins.

In a 1922 article in the British Medical Journal Cheatle said that by the time breast cancer became visible it was often too late to be cured by surgery. In 1922 Cheatle proposed that inflamed and cystic breasts should be removed surgically. He coauthored the textbook Tumours of the Breast (1931) with the American surgeon Max Cutter. This was called "the first modern textbook of mammary pathology". The textbook said that if there was only one "blue dome cyst" in a breast, removal of the cyst was usually sufficient. However, it was safer to remove the whole breast in cases of generalised cystic disease. Cheatle had found that such breasts often contained hidden carcinoma.

Cheatle was a contemporary of Joseph Colt Bloodgood, who was studying the pathology and clinical treatment of prolifierative duct lesions of the breast in Johns Hopkins Hospital in the United States during the same period. It is not clear how much the influence the two men had on each other, since the published works of both generally do not refer to the work of other researchers, but most likely they reached the same conclusions independently.

== Recognition ==
Cheatle was appointed Companion of the Order of the Bath (CB) in 1901. He was appointed Commander of the Royal Victorian Order (CVO) in the 1912 Birthday Honours and knighted as Knight Commander of the Order of the Bath (KCB) in the 1918 New Year Honours.

He was made a Chevalier of the French Legion of Honour and a Knight Grand Cross of the Order of the Crown of Italy. Only American citizens are allowed to lecture at the Edward Hines Jr. VA Hospital in Chicago. He was granted American citizenship for a week so that he could lecture there. In 1931 Cheatle was awarded the Walker Prize by the Royal College of Surgeons for work on the Pathology and Therapeutics of Cancer. He was made an Honorary Fellow of the American College of Surgeons in 1932.

== Family ==
Cheatle married at the Savoy Chapel on 2 October 1902 Clara Denman Jobb, daughter of Colonel Keith Jopp, of the Royal Engineers.
