= The preventive obstacle; or, Conjugal onanism =

Work by Louis François Étienne Bergere

- Language: English
- Publisher: Turner and Mignard Printers and Publishers
- Publication date: 1870

The preventive obstacle; or, Conjugal onanism is the English translation by P. De Marmon of the third French edition of Louis François Étienne Bergeret's book Des Fraudes dans l'Accomplissement des Fonctions Generatrices (1868). It was published in 1870 by Turner and Mignard Printers and Publishers. In the book, Bergeret used his nineteenth century clinical case studies to demonstrate his anti-contraception beliefs and his theory that sexual excitement without conception was "fraud", which leads to uterine inflammation, "indirect infanticide", and various physical and psychological illnesses in women. In 1874, the Royal Medical and Chirurgical Society of London library ordered the book to be burned.
