= OUB Chambers =

Building in Singapore

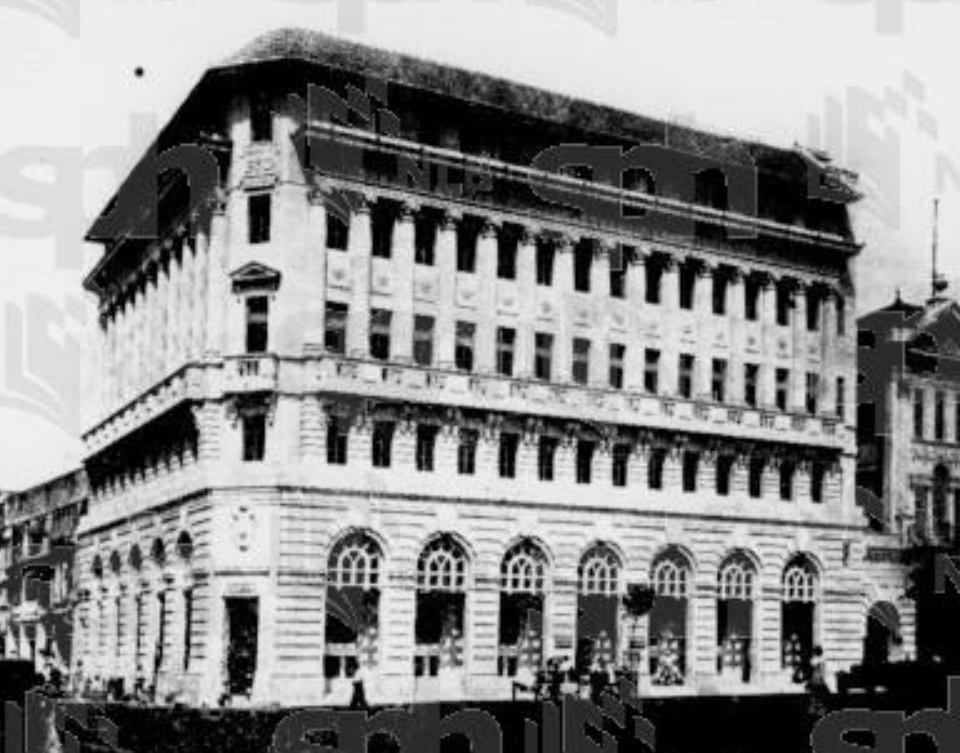
- The building in 1930

General information
- Coordinates: 1.283847°N 103.851088°E
- Opened: 1 December 1930
- Demolished: 1979

Design and construction
- Architecture firm: Swan & Maclaren
- Main contractor: United Engineers Limited

OUB Chambers, initially known as Meyer Chambers, was a building on the corner of Malacca Street and Raffles Place. Built in 1930, the building served as the head offices of the Overseas Union Bank, Overseas Union Insurance and the Overseas Assurance Corporation.

== History ==
The building was officially opened on 1 December 1930. Swan & Maclaren were the building's architects while United Engineers Limited were the building's general contractors. The building was owned by prominent businessman Isaac Manasseh Meyer.

The Overseas Union Bank opened in the building on 5 February 1949. This made the Overseas Union Bank the first local bank at Raffles Place. From March 1957 to 1968, the building also served as the head offices of the Overseas Union Insurance Limited. The building also housed the head offices of the Overseas Assurance Corporation. The building was put up for sale in 1974 by Meyers' wife, Sally Isaac Meyer.

The building was demolished in 1979 to make way for One Raffles Place. The Overseas Union Bank's headquarters were temporarily moved to 60 Robinson Road.
