= Alfonso Cumberbatch =

British surgeon (1847–1929)

Alfonso Elkin Cumberbatch FRCS (11 April 1847 – 25 March 1929) was an ear surgeon and president of the Otological Society of the United Kingdom (founded 1899). At his endorsement in 1907 it merged with the Royal Society of Medicine to became the Section of Otology, on the condition that it remained separated from the specialty of the throat, with the specialty of the nose welcome to join either. (Note: Rhinology and laryngology joined to form the Laryngology and Rhinology Section)
