= Duncan Cheatle =

British businessman

Duncan Cheatle is an entrepreneur and supporter of UK enterprise. He has founded and co-founded multiple enterprise support initiatives, including The Supper Club, a London-based membership club for fast-growth entrepreneurs; Startup Britain, a privately sector funded, not-for-profit national campaign to 'celebrate, inspire, and accelerate enterprise in the UK'; and LearnAmp, a learning platform that aggregates and curates learning content from across the web.

== Businesses ==
Cheatle is CEO and founder of Prelude, a business whose stated mission is 'Making Britain the most enterprising nation in the world.' Prelude, founded in 2000, is an entrepreneurial support organisation providing networking, training programmes and other support services to UK entrepreneurs.

Included within The Prelude Group are a number of different businesses: The Supper Club, a 'membership group exclusively for fast-growth entrepreneurs', The Director's Club, 'development for directors of entrepreneurial businesses', Speaker Boutique, 'insights on scaling your business from entrepreneurs who have', and Growth Programmes, 'structured learning for entrepreneurs and their teams'.

== Public campaigns and initiatives ==
=== Tax reports ===
In 2016, Prelude, in partnership with the Institute of Directors and Grant Thornton, released a report on the tax burden faced by UK entrepreneurs. The report, 'A Tax Code for Global Ambition,' proposed a number of recommendations around the simplification and alteration of taxes paid by small business owners.

The report follows a 2012 report by Prelude in partnership with PwC, 'The Unsung Heroes of Business: The Total Tax Contribution of Entrepreneurs.' This report looked at the total tax contributions of seven UK-based entrepreneurial enterprises, based on all business and employment taxes paid by the businesses.

=== Growth Britain ===
In 2013, Prelude ran a nationwide crowd-sourced ideas generation campaign asking the public to pitch their ideas on how entrepreneurship could be better incentivised and supported. The campaign was backed by then Enterprise Advisor to the Prime Minister Lord Young.

This online campaign asked people to contribute ideas, vote on others and participate in discussion of these ideas. The users making the best contributions (based on greatest possible impact) were invited to an event at Downing Street to explore their ideas.

=== Start Up Britain ===
In 2011, Cheatle co-founded Start Up Britain, a privately led national campaign to promote UK entrepreneurship. The initiative was launched by British Prime Minister David Cameron, and has the support of HM government as well as a number of international corporations including AXA, Barclays, Intel, BlackBerry, Experian, Google, Virgin Media, Microsoft, McKinsey & Co and O2.

Cheatle, with The Supper Club, offered a mentoring scheme as part of Start Up Britain's offering for its first year. This scheme provided over 1600 hours of mentoring by experienced entrepreneurs to early stage businesses.

=== CGT taper relief ===
In 2007 Cheatle led a campaign against plans announced by then UK Chancellor Alistair Darling to abolish taper relief on entrepreneurial businesses, a tax relief originally introduced in 1998 with the stated intention of increasing investment to small and medium businesses. Cheatle's petition against the abolition of taper relief on the Downing Street website received over 18,000 signatures and the campaign was widely covered in the UK press at the time. Following the negative public response to the proposals, the Treasury introduced a new tax relief measure known as Entrepreneurs' Relief.

== Public profile and leadership ==
In 2012, Cheatle became a director of the newly formed Start Up Loans company, a government funded organisation providing mentor-supported loans to young people looking to start their own businesses. The scheme, which also involved Dragon's Den star James Caan, was promoted by 12 "ambassadors" including young entrepreneurs such as James Eder (The Beans Group), Emily Bendell (Bluebella) and Romy Lewis (Lola's Kitchen).

He is a member of the advisory board for Sheffield University Management School, and also on the advisory board for The Centre for Entrepreneurs, a think tank founded and chaired by serial entrepreneur Luke Johnson.

Cheatle regularly writes for and comments on enterprise related matters in the business press and has spoken at events for the British Private Equity and Venture Capital Association, Entrepreneur Country, Made Festival, and the IAEW among others. He has judged on panels for UnLtd's Big Venture Challenge, the Fast Growth Business Awards, and the National Business Awards.

== Awards ==
In 2010 The Supper Club won the SFEDI Award for Enterprise Network Builder of the Year.

In 2014, Cheatle was listed at number 21 on the Fresh Business Thinking Power 100, a list 'of those with the most power to impact on entrepreneurship.'

In 2016, Prelude won the STEVIE Management Team of the Year (More than 10 employees), and was named as a finalist for the National Business Awards Business Enabler of the Year.
