= K. P. K. Menon =

Indian lawyer and activist

K. P. Keshava Menon (1884?–?) was an Indian lawyer and a leading Indian independence activist from Kerala who was a key proponent of the formation of the Indian Independence League (IIL) and a lawyer for the Indian National Army (INA).

Menon was educated in Madras and England and had started his own in law practice in Kozhikode shortly after World War I and later opened a branch of Annie Besant's Home Rule movement. He moved to Madras where he started a branch of the New Fabian Society to "study public questions while simultaneously organising a union for rickshaw pullers".

He then returned to Kerala to meet with C. Rajagopalachari and subsequently joined Mahatma Gandhi's non-cooperation movement, and while there after learning local press would not publish Congress party news, he started his own Malayalam daily newspaper. In 1927, after serving a prison sentence and his wife and daughter were killed, he moved to Malaysia with his remaining family, to work as a lawyer and initiate peace relations and his son, Unni, joined the Royal Air Force. Menon would frequently listen to the Italian and German broadcasts and was delighted at their defeats.

In the 1930s, he also helped form the Council of Action with Rash Behari Bose as President and General Mohan Singh, then-Lt. Col. Mian Ghulam Jilani and Menon as members, which "prepared the broad outline of plans and attacks and policies to attack India" and was complete with a committee of representatives and territorial and local branches. The Japanese, however, would interfere with Menon's Indian radio broadcasts while he was in Singapore. In 1942 resigned from both the Council of Action and the INA, but on 22 April 1944, he was arrested anyway by the Japanese Security Police and, while being arrested for no, he criticized the Japanese and Subhas Chandra Bose, whom he outspokingly distrusted and despised, saying "You say Bose is a man of action, so is my pet ape; man of Action indeed, he acts and thinks afterwards" and also called Bose a ne'er-do-well. This behavior was considered inappropriate to Bose and the Japanese and interrogated Menon for over two months and a military court sentenced him to six years for "lack of faith in Japan and calling Bose a fascist. Despite the situation, Bose never ordered the arrest or was involved in this matter."

As a IIL delegate, he attended various meetings in Tokyo, Bangkok and Malaysia and was acquainted with the Fujiwara clan.

K. P. K., as he came to be called, later became a fierce critic of Japanese imperialist designs with regard to India and the Indian Independence League and was later arrested by the Kempeitai. Involved with the India nationalists, he visited Kozhikode in 1946 and 1947 took a diplomatic post from 1947 to 1948. His arrest ultimately is said to have led to the precipitation of Mohan Singh Deb's confrontation with the Japanese high command in Singapore, where Menon was working as a lawyer and a recognized leader of the Indian community in Singapore, and his resignation from the INA in December 1942 and the collapse of the first INA. He was also the editor of The Great Trial of Mahatma Gandhi and Mr. Banker (1922) and also the author Chattambi Swamigal: The Great Scholar - Saint of India (1967).

In 2014, Dr. Rajesh Rai, assistant director and senior fellow at the Institute of South Asian Studies and assistant professor of South Asian Studies Programme at National University of Singapore, published the book Indians In Singapore, 1819-1945: Diaspora In The Colonial Port-City through Oxford University Press which included Menon.

== Works ==
- Chattambi Swamigal: The Great Scholar - Saint of India (1967)
- K. Nagarajan's Writings - An Introduction (1984, Emerald Group Publishing

== As editor ==
- A Poet in Search of God
