= Cheadle =

Cheadle may refer to:

- Cheadle, Alberta, Canada
- Cheadle, Greater Manchester, England
  - Cheadle (UK Parliament constituency), a constituency composed of the town and environs of Cheadle, Greater Manchester, England
- Cheadle, Staffordshire, England
- Cheadle Yorkshire, a fictional character in the manga series Hunter × Hunter

== People with the surname ==
- Alfred S. Cheadle (1853–1923), Australian wool broker
- Ashley Cheadle (born 1987), Australian surfer, model and actress
- Don Cheadle (born 1964), American actor
- Edwin K. Cheadle (c. 1895–1981), Justice of the Montana Supreme Court
- Frank Cheadle (1885–1916), Australian rugby footballer
- Richard Cheadle (born 1950), former Royal Navy officer and Controller of the Navy
- Vernon Cheadle (1910–1995), American plant scientist
- Walter Butler Cheadle (1836–1910), English paediatrician

== See also ==
- Cheadle Heath, part of Stockport, Greater Manchester, England
- Cheadle Hulme, part of Stockport, Greater Manchester, England
