= Albert John Chalmers =

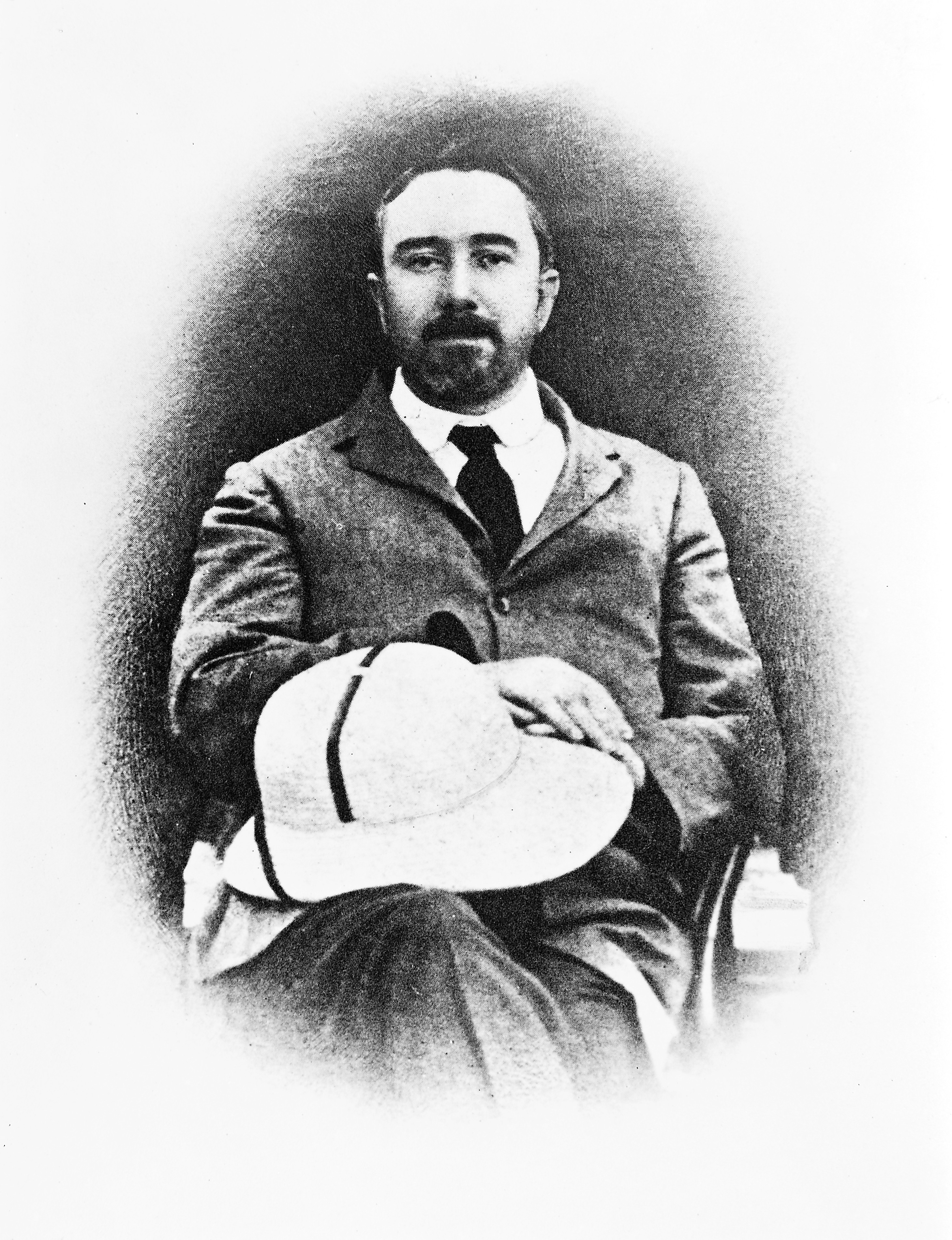
Albert John Chalmers

Albert John Chalmers (28 March 1870 - 5 April 1920) was a British colonial physician who was a research pioneer in tropical medicine.

== Biography ==
Albert John Chalmers was born in Manchester on 28 March 1870. He received his qualifications in 1890 at University College, Liverpool, holding the Holt Fellowship. He joined the West African Medical Service, where he served for four years at the Gold Coast Colony, as the assistant colonial surgeon. He was the acting principal medical officer in the colony during the Siege of Kumassi in 1900 when he was mentioned in despatches and subsequently received the Ashanti Medal and clasp for his service.

He left for Ceylon in 1901 where he worked for the next ten years as the registrar and lecturer on pathology at the Colombo Medical College.

He was a captain in the Ceylon Volunteer Medical Corps and president of the Ceylon branch of the British Medical Association in 1907.

In 1911 he was awarded the King George V Coronation Medal. After serving with the Pellagra Field Commission in 1913 he was appointed as the Director of the Wellcome Tropical Research Laboratories in Khartoum. By then he was a well known name in tropical medicine. While in Colombo he co-authored with Aldo Castellani the Manual of Tropical Medicine, the first edition of which appeared in 1910 and was described by F. H. Garrison as “the best modern book on tropical medicine”.

In February 1920, Chalmers turned in his resignation to the Sudan Government and left to travel the world with his wife Alice. While traveling in India, Chalmers fell ill and died on 5 April 1920 of acute infective jaundice.

The Chalmers Memorial Medal is offered annually by the Royal Society of Tropical Medicine and Hygiene, in recognition of outstanding research contributing to knowledge of tropical medicine and tropical hygiene.

== Selected publications ==
- Simple Medical Directions for Officials in Ceylon
