= Louis François Étienne Bergeret =

French physician

Louis François Étienne Bergeret also Bergeret d’Arbois (17 December 1814 – 3 January 1893, Arbois) was a French physician.

Bergeret worked at the Hôpital Civil d’Arbois. He was a friend of Louis Pasteur (1822–1895). Bergeret is famous for his early use of insects in a criminal investigation making him one of the first forensic entomologists.

Bergeret performed an autopsy on the mummified body of an infant discovered in a Paris house in 1855. He recognized and drew conclusions from the pattern of succession of different insect species onto the corpse, and also saw the significance of the duration of the life cycles of the different cadaver insects. His analysis of the insect evidence led to the conclusion that the child had died seven years earlier. The police suspects were the young couple occupying the house seven years before, in 1848, and they were subsequently arrested and convicted of murder of the child.

In 1866 he published The preventive obstacle; or, Conjugal onanism in which he expressed his disapproval of sexual activity for anything but procreation, linking it to cases of physical dysfunction and disease he had treated as a doctor, as well as to moral degeneration. In another work, he discusses the dangers of alcoholism to family and society.

His dying quote was "I wish to find more about forensics."

== Publications ==
- 1855, 'Infanticide, Momification naturelle du cadavre', Annales d’hygiène publique et de médecine légale, série 2, no 4.- Paris: Jean-Baptiste Baillière.
- 1866, La fièvre intermittante dans le Jura, Typ. Ganthier Frères à Lons-le-Saunier.
- 1868. Des Fraudes dans l’accomplissement des fonctions génératries, dangers et inconvénients pour les individus, la famille et la société, Paris, J.-B. Baillière et fils.
- 1869, L'alcoolisme: dangers et inconvénients de l'abus des boissons alcolliques pour les individus, la famille, la société. Paris: J.-B. Baillière.
