= Robert Michael Forde =

- Born: 1861
- Died: 27 March 1948 (aged 86–87)
- Occupation: Physician
- Known for: Made the first definitive observation of trypanosomes in a human being
- Relatives: Alice Maude Sangster
- Medical career
- Research: Parasitology

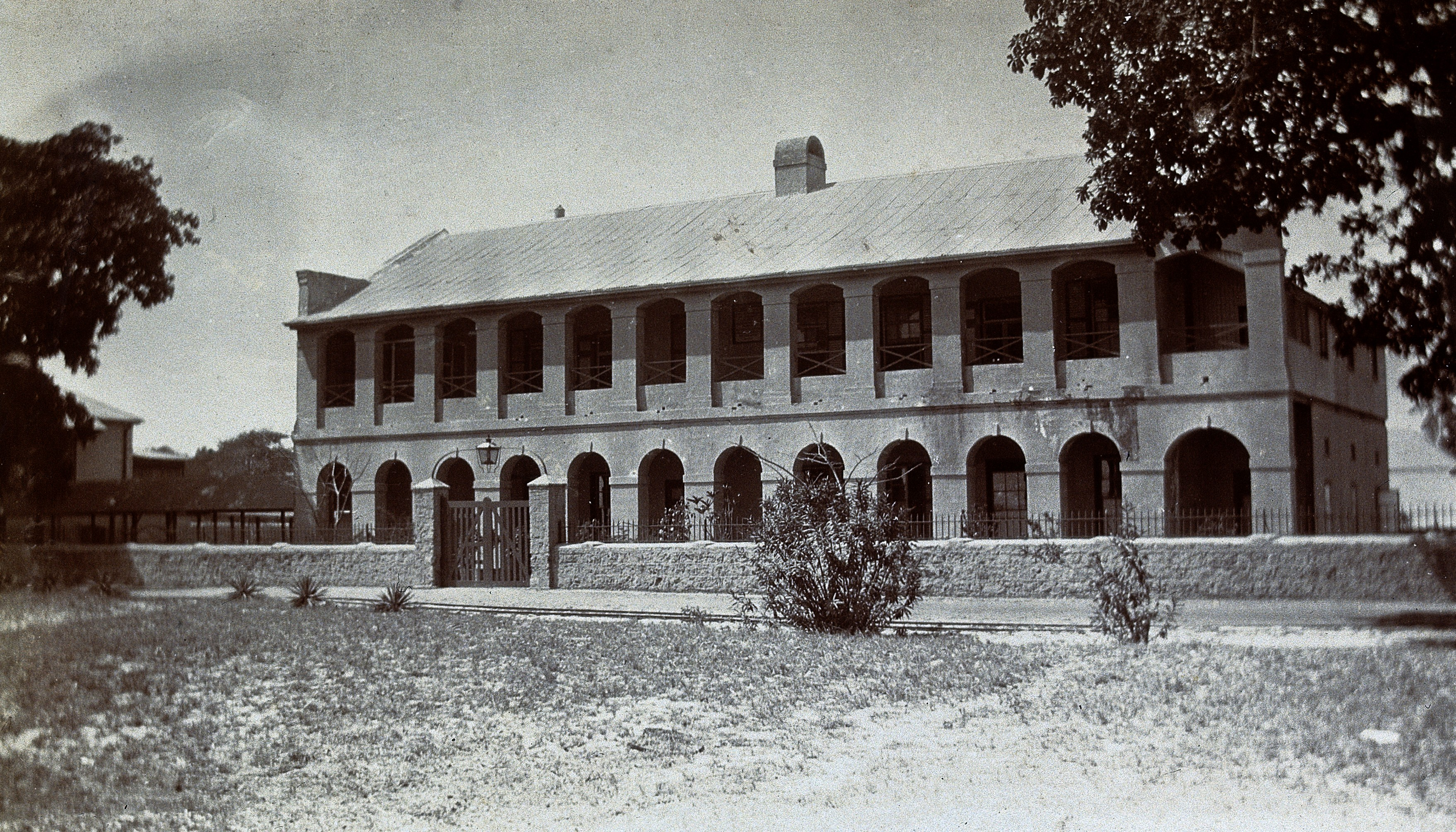
The hospital in Bathurst, Gambia, c. 1911

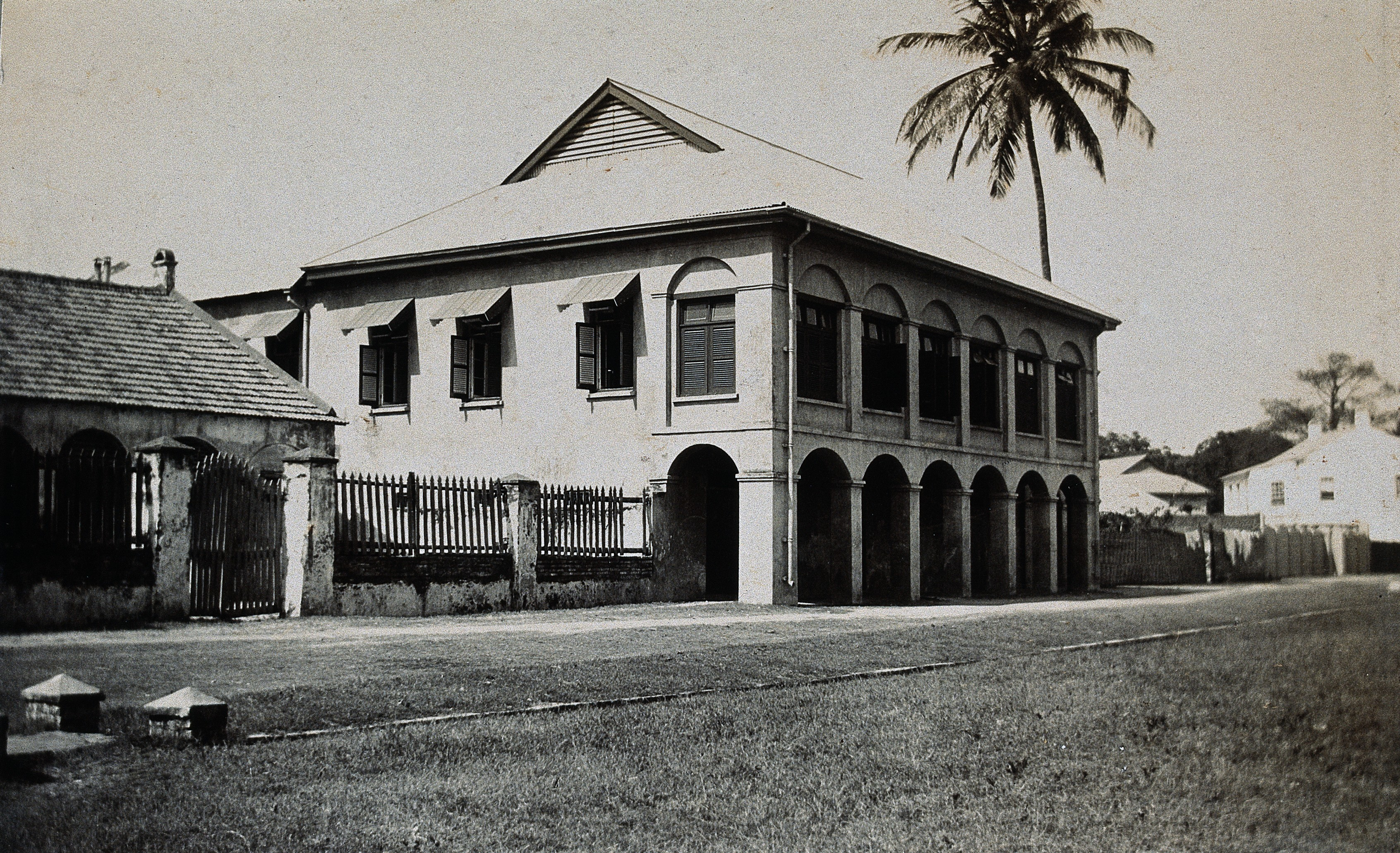
The senior medical officers' quarters in Bathurst, c. 1911

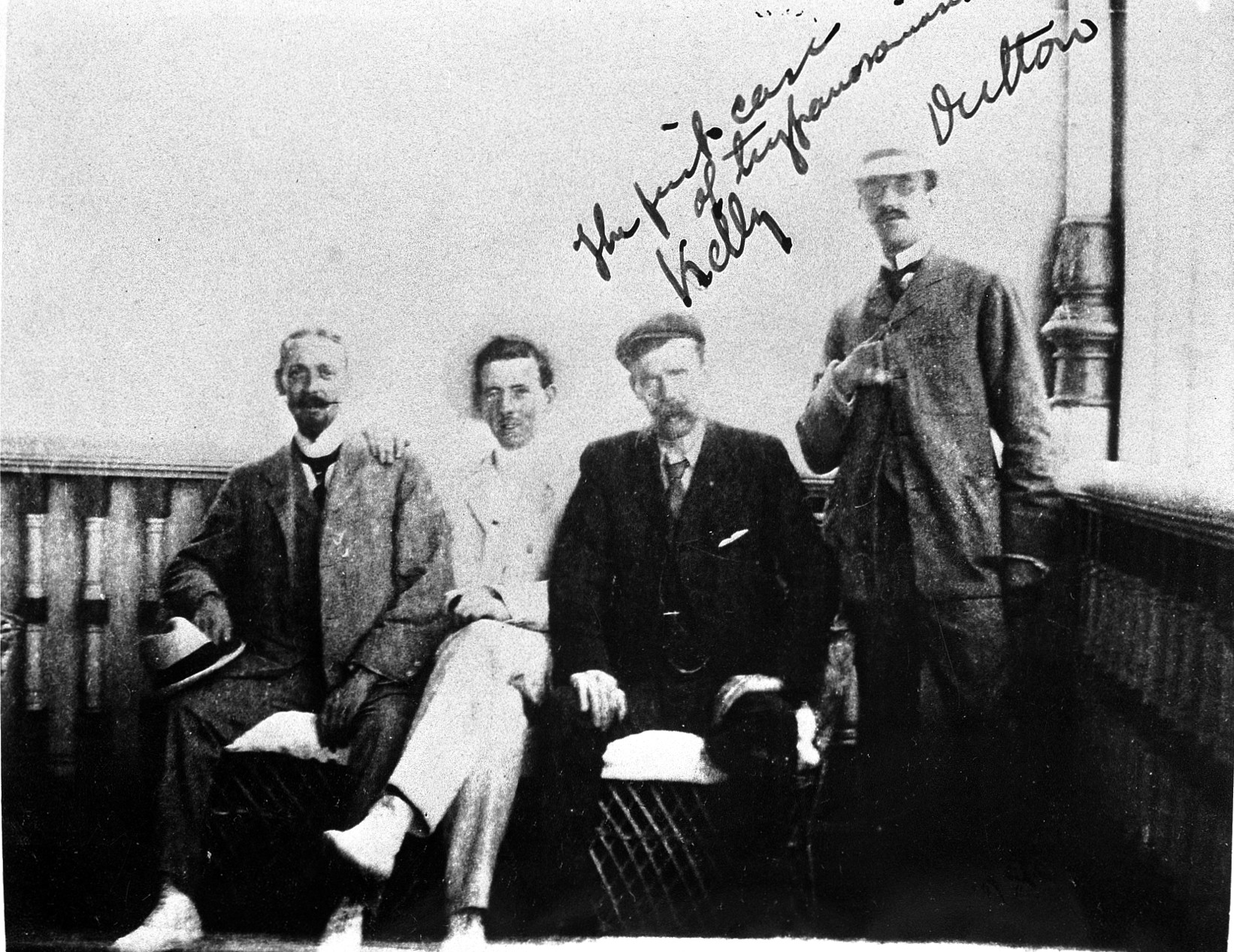
First case of trypanosomatida, with Kelly, Forde and Dutton. Credit: Wellcome Library

Robert Michael Forde (1861 – 27 March 1948) was Colonial Surgeon in The Gambia when in 1901, he made the first definitive observation of trypanosomes in a human being when he found them in the blood of a steamboat master on the Gambia River. In 1907 he became principal medical officer of Sierra Leone.

== Early life and family ==
Robert Forde was born in Cloyne, Co. Cork in 1861. He married Alice Maude Sangster in Kensington, London, in 1898.

== Career ==
Forde qualified as LRCP and LRCS. He served as acting colonial surgeon in the Gold Coast (modern Ghana) from November 1891 and acting district commissioner of Axim from 1892. He served on the Anglo-French boundary commission in 1892. He was the medical officer on the special mission to Kumasi from December 1894 to January 1895. In February 1895 he was appointed Colonial Surgeon in The Gambia and senior medical officer there in 1904. In 1907 he became principal medical officer of Sierra Leone.

== Sleeping sickness ==
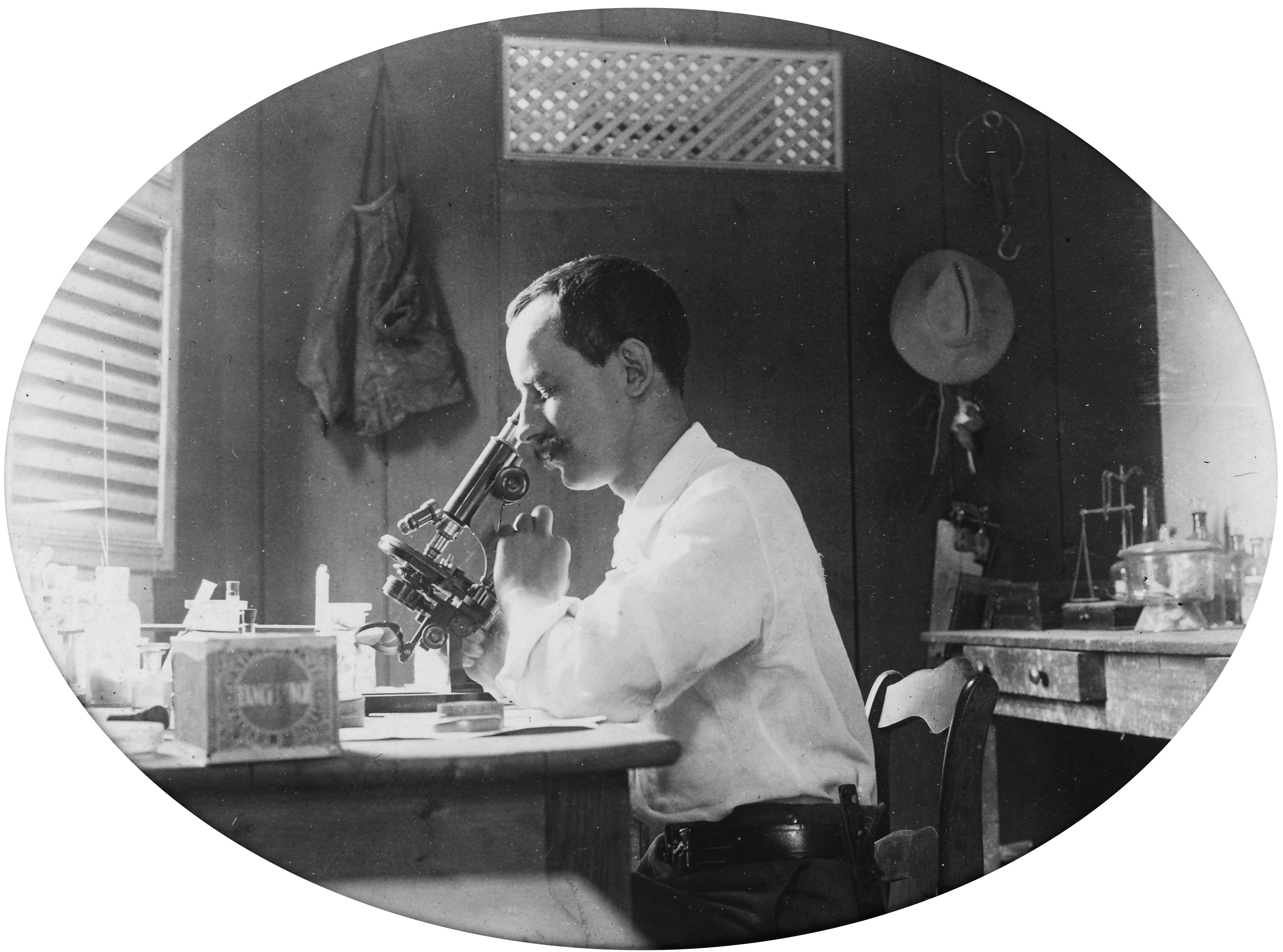
Joseph Dutton in The Gambia in 1902–03

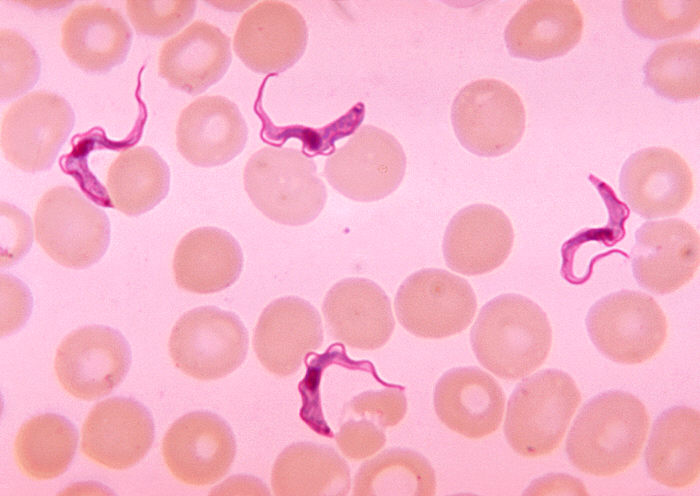
Trypanosoma forms in a blood smear, the species that causes human trypanosomiasis.

David Bruce, a British army captain investigating the cause of sleeping sickness in animals (nagana), had discovered trypanosomes in the blood of a cow in South Africa in 1894 and these were named Trypanosoma brucei in 1899.

In 1901, Robert Forde was working at the hospital in Bathurst, Gambia, when he made the first definitive observation of trypanosomes in a human being when he unknowingly found them in the blood of H. Kelly, a 42-year-old steamboat master on the Gambia River who had originally been thought to be suffering from malaria. Kelly had been working on the river for six years and had been ill with malaria on several occasions. Forde thought the "small worm-like, extremely active bodies" were filiarae (a type of parasitic nematode).

Soon after, they were identified as trypanosomes by Joseph Everett Dutton who wrote that it was "impossible to decide definitely as to the species, but if on further study it should be found to differ from the other disease producing trypanosomes I would suggest that it be called Trypanosoma gambiensé" (now T. b. gambiense).

Towards the end of 1902, Forde clarified in the British Medical Journal that he first saw Kelly in May 1901, excluded malaria and alerted Dutton to the organisms he found in the blood. Forde claimed that it was at his [Forde's] own mention that Dutton recognized the trypanosomes.

Around the same time, trypanosomes were discovered in the cerebrospinal fluid of sleeping sickness patients by the Italian physician Aldo Castellani.

In 1902, Louis Westenra Sambon raised doubts over Forde and Dutton's priority in discovering the trypanosome, and claimed that they had been preceded by Gustave Nepveu. Sambon accused the Liverpool School of Tropical Medicine of overlooking his contributions. This theory was discarded by Ronald Ross who backed Dutton and Forde, and argued that Nepveu had not provided convincing evidence of this.

Dutton died in the Congo in 1905 from tick fever that he contracted while researching trypanosomiasis.

== Death and legacy ==
Forde died at the Pentlands Nursing Home in Worthing, Sussex, on 27 March 1948. Probate was granted to his widow Alice on his estate of £4,802.

== Selected publications ==
- "Some clinical notes on a European patient in whose blood a Trypanosoma was observed", Journal of Tropical Medicine, 1902, No. 5, pp. 261–263.
