= Thomas Crichton Mugliston =

Thomas Crichton Mugliston (28 February 1854–May 1931) was a Colonial Surgeon in Singapore and Penang and a founder of the Straits Medical Association.

== Career ==
Mugliston was born on 28 February 1854. He served as a surgeon of the Royal Navy from 1876 to 1878. Shortly after he left the navy, he moved to Singapore. In 1887, he became a member of the Municipal Commission of Singapore. On 16 July 1888, he was made the Colonial Surgeon of Singapore. From February to August 1889, he served as the Acting Principal Medical Officer of Singapore for Maximilian Frank Simon. In 1890, he helped to form the Straits Medical Association. He was made the Colonial Surgeon of Penang on 1 March 1901. From April to December 1901, he served as the Acting Principal Medical Officer for Thomas Sharp Kerr. He retired on pension on 5 January 1908.

Following his retirement, he became the director of several companies. During World War I, he was in charge of the London Ambulance Service.

== Personal life and death ==
In 1887, Mugliston married Emma Struder, the daughter of the American Consul-General in Singapore. They had two sons, Francis Hugh Mugliston and G. R. K. Mugliston, and a daughter, Mrs. C. V. Miles. He was also a prominent cricketer, golfer and billiards player, and was "among Singapore's best golfers of his day".

Mugliston died in May 1931.
