= Chartered Bank Building, Singapore =

Building in Singapore

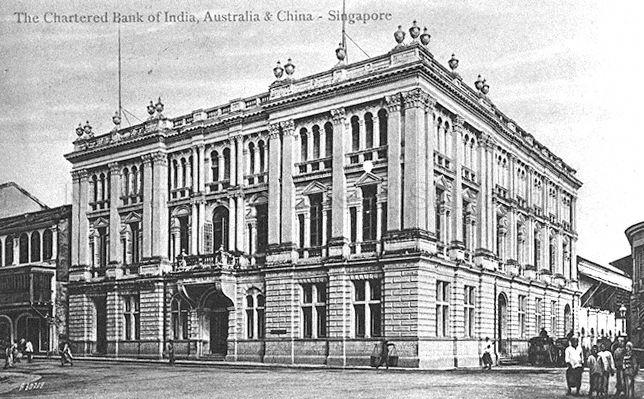
- The Chartered Bank Building in the 1900s
- Interactive map of the Chartered Bank Building, Singapore area
- Alternative names: Bank of China Building

General information
- Status: Demolished
- Type: Bank
- Architectural style: Palazzo
- Coordinates: 1.28572°N 103.8523°E
- Completed: 1895
- Demolished: 1947

Height
- Height: 8 metres (26 ft)

Design and construction
- Architecture firm: Swan & Maclaren

The Chartered Bank Building was a landmark at the corner of Battery Road and Flint Street in Singapore. Completed in 1895, it housed the Chartered Bank of India, Australia and China until 1916, when the bank moved elsewhere and was replaced as tenant by the Bank of Taiwan, which remained there until the 1930s. The building was then taken over by the newly-established Gian Singh & Co. department store as well as retailer M. S. Ally & Co. In 1938, the property was acquired by the Bank of China, who renamed it the Bank of China Building. The structure was demolished in 1947 to make way for the Bank of China Building.

== Description ==
The three-story palazzo-style structure was built on a 160 x 160ft site. It was around 60ft tall. The exterior up to the first floor cornice was rusticated, featuring a 6ft tall granite base with moulded coping at the bottom. The upper floors were divided into five bays by two-storey Corinthian fluted pilasters, with three Romanesque windows between each on the top floor. The fenestration of the piano nobile floor was, on the other hand, "more Baroque than Renaissance." The building was topped by a Corinthian heavy frieze cornice and entablature, with a balustraded parapet accompanied by a row of ornamental urns. There were two entrances, the main entrance being on the centre of the Battery Road front with a side entrance on Flint Street. The main entrance was accompanied from above by a balcony with corbels "springing" from the pilasters. The windows of the ground floor were to be made of polished plate glass.

The main entrance on Battery Road led to a 19 by 33ft entrance hall, separated from the rest of the floor by a series of arches. The 19ft-tall hall on the ground floor, with a floor space of 66 by 86ft, housed the cash department, which featured a semi-circular counter with a pilastered and panelled front that ran its entire breadth. The floor of the telling room was lined with encaustic tiles. At the end of this hall was the 26 by 28ft fireproof bullion strongroom, accessible from all sides, with walls made of solid granite and concrete laid with iron rails, respectively. Also housed on this floor were two retail units. The larger of the two, with a floor space of 52 by 31ft, was in the front, while the second, 38 by 31ft unit was in the back.

A staircase at the entrance hall led to the 18ft-tall public offices hall on the first floor, which had about the same floor space as the cash department. Also on this floor were the 15 by 32ft manager's room and the 16 by 20ft book-safe. The lavatories to the back of this hall were reserved for European staff. A private 6ft-wide staircase on Flint Street led to the top floor, 15ft 3in from floor to ceiling, which housed the European staff quarters, with amenities including a 10ft-wide verandah, dining and sitting rooms, one of which overlooked the ocean, and bedrooms, in addition to servants' offices, bathrooms, a kitchen and a large open court for ventilation. The upper floors also housed office space to be let out, with two units, being of similar sizes to the ground floor shops, on each floor. These were accessed through a staircase on Battery Road. This was designed such that additional office space could be attained through "knocking down a couple of bricked arches which have been built specially to that end.

== History ==
=== Chartered Bank and Bank of Taiwan ===
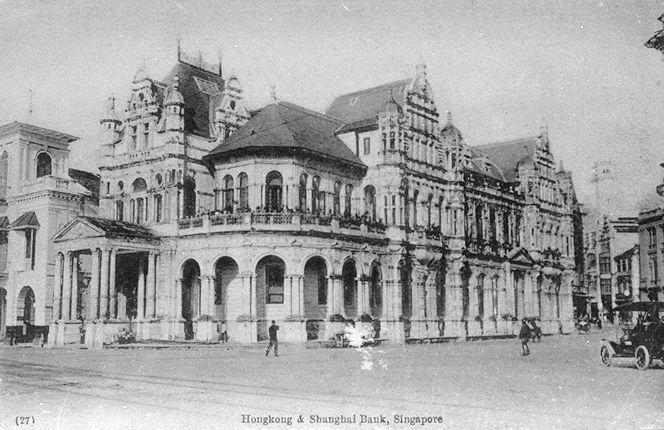
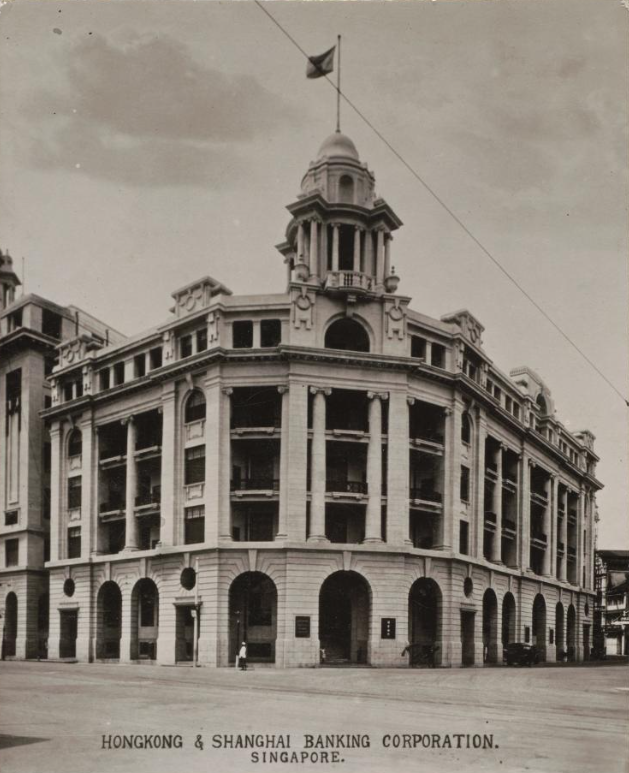
The Hongkong and Shanghai Bank Building (left) stood just across the road from the Chartered Bank Building until 1919, when was demolished to make way for the Hongkong Bank Chambers, completed 1924.

In the early 1890s, the management of the Singapore branch of the Chartered Bank of India, Australia and China, founded in 1859 and previously located at Raffles Place, had come to the decision that a new building was necessary. In December 1893, the bank leased a plot of land at the corner of Battery Road and Flint Street, then at 2 Battery Road, from the estate of Raffles Flint with the intent of erecting their new premises, believing that the bank's property should not be kept on landed property. The site had previously occupied by the godowns of McAlister & Co. and McKerrow & Co., which had been razed in a "disastrous" fire in July. Despite being further away from Fullerton Square than the bank's previous offices, the site was closer to the Exchange Building and the General Post Office, and was just across the street from the yet-to-be-completed Hongkong and Shanghai Bank Building, as well as the Medical Hall and Gresham House. Additionally, it stood near Johnston's Pier and in front of the Cavenagh Bridge, then a major entrance into town.

The firm Swan & Maclaren was commissioned to design the structure. Writer Julian Davison notes that while there is "no confirmed record" of the building's architect, it "seems likely that it was the work of James Meikle", who retired from both Swan & Maclaren and Singapore as a whole due to his declining health before the building's completion. The ironwork and woodwork were supplied by Howarth, Erskine & Co. and Powell & Co., respectively. John Little & Co. furnished the upper floor dwellings. Construction cost around $60,000. In November 1894, The Straits Times opined that the structure, then "rapidly approaching completion", was "first-class" and "undoubtedly a fine and stately structure of great solidity", presenting a "solid appearance" already despite its incomplete state. The Straits Mail felt that the structure was "handsome and massive without being heavy", considering it a "worthy vis a vis" to the Hongkong and Shanghai Bank Building, also the work of Swan & Maclaren, which was "more ornate" though "less satisfactory in an architectural sense."

The building was ready for occupation in 1895, and the bank moved in on 6 February. By then, the upper floor offices had been sublet. The tenants included Swan & Maclaren, who were previously located at the Flint's Building, and the Town Store of Howarth, Erskine & Co., who sought a larger premises. The Pharmacy, advertised as "CHEMISTS, DRUGGISTS and OPTICIANS" and headed by Dr. G. von Wedel, moved into the second floor in October 1904. In that year, architectural firm Lermit & Westerhout were commissioned by the trustees of the Flint estate to work on the roof. The dental surgery firm Kew Brothers & Hahn, a partnership between the Kew brothers of Hong Kong and the American Dr. Hahn, opened in the building in January 1905. Hahn left the partnership by October, after which the practice rebranded as simply Kew Brothers. The firm left Singapore in August 1907.

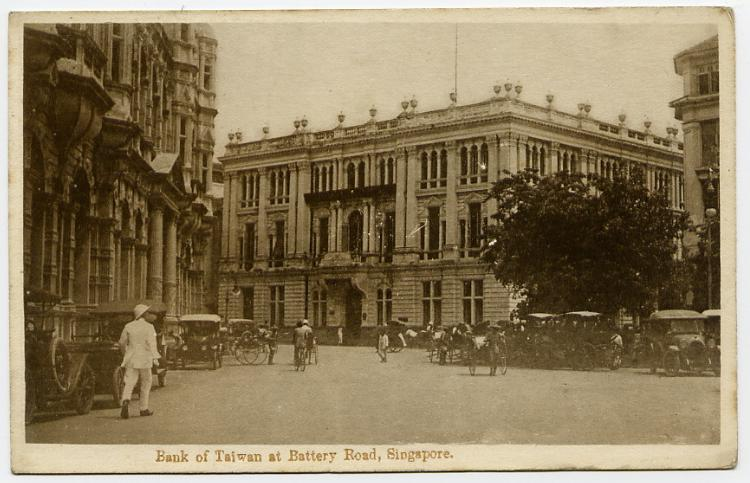
The building, then occupied by the Bank of Taiwan. in the 1920s.

By the early 1910s, the bank had grown such that the building "constricted" to the point that it was no longer adequate to serve as its premises, so much so that it was "forced upon the bank the expediency of acquiring more suitable premises", being "unsuitable" for a business of the bank's "importance." The "obvious disadvantages" of having the departments spread across two floors led the bank to initially consider evicting The Pharmacy, though it was instead decided that the bank should relocate. Swan & Maclaren, acting on the bank's behalf, acquired the Dispensary Building at the junction of Battery Road and Bonham Street from Seah Eng Kun and Seah Eng Kiat, with the intent of pulling down that building and constructing a new premises, to be designed by Swan & Maclaren. Work on that building began in 1914 and concluded in 1916, with the Chartered Bank officially relocating its offices to the Chartered Bank Chambers on 6 May. The banks furnishings were then sold off later that month by Powell & Co. In June, The Pharmacy acquired the Medical Hall Branch of Medical Hall Limited and relocated to that firm's premises just across the street, carrying on business as "Medical Hall" instead.

In June 1916, a month after the building had been vacated by the Chartered Bank, the Japanese-founded Bank of Taiwan and the Mitsui Bussan Kaisha, moved their offices into the ground and first floors, respectively. The Singapore branch of the bank, which "primarily handled foreign exchange transactions and loans to Japanese rubber planters and businessmen", was founded at the Rubber Exchange Building at 100 Robinson Road in 1912, while the Singapore branch of the Mitsui Bussan Kaisha, the first Japanese trading company in Singapore, was previously located on the upper floors of the Dispensary Building. The building's address was then shifted to 1 Battery Road. In 1923, the Free Press proclaimed that the Bank of Taiwan Building and the Chartered Bank Chambers were both "monuments of stability and prosperity" which "would not be shamed were they carried eight thousand miles and set among the solid architecture of Lombard Street or Threadneedle Street", and that their position only "[enhanced] the lack of dignity possessed by the range of buildings that [intervened] and [ran] the length of Battery Road on the opposite side." The building's address had again been shifted, this time to 4 Battery Road, in April of that year. In May 1931, the bank relocated to 31 Raffles Place.

=== Gian Singh, M. S. Ally and Bank of China ===
Following the removal of the Bank of Taiwan, the building was still vacant in June 1933. The following year, architect Heinrich Rudolf Arbenz was commissioned to work on the building. The Advertising & Publicity Bureau Ltd. moved in by May, and the building had become Publicity House by August 1935. On 8 October 1934, the Gian Singh & Co. department store of Kuala Lumpur, known for its "displays of materials, millinery, ladies' and mens' wear and the keenness of their prices", opened a branch headed by brothers Hardial Singh Bajaj and Pritam Singh in the building's basement, which they had "entirely renovated", installing large display windows and "ample, airy quarters for the tremendous amount and variety of stocks on hand." This was ahead of the store's scheduled official opening on 20 October. The Malaya Tribune then noted that while the displays were still "not very complete", they made a "very worthy array which [was] a promise of the things yet to come."

The store was officially opened on 3 November. The Straits Times then reported that the branch was "the first Asiatic undertaking of its kind." The store claimed to sell products "for every nationality in Singapore", including "brightly coloured 'sarees'" for Indian women and "bajus" for Malay and Chinese women in the women's department. There was a "large dressmaking staff of experienced tailors" and the men's tailoring department had "one of the best" head cutters on the island. On the official opening day, the store was reportedly "crowded with those who went to see and those who went to buy." The store was reportedly patronised by hundreds of customers on that day. The Southern Godown Co., landing agents for the Singapore branch of the Ishihara Sangyo Kaisha, moved in by September 1936.

In May 1937, the Bank of China acquired the property, then "one of the most valuable in Singapore" and occupied by Gian Singh & Co. and retailer M. S. Ally & Co., for $715,000. They intended to pull down the structure and erect their own premises, as their premises on Cecil Street were "growing too small" for them. However, this was not to take place until the lease on that property ran out four years later. The building, which was then at 4-6 Battery Road, became the Bank of China Building. At the end of May, the Mayfair Cafe, serving "Maison Lyons 'Darjeeling' tea, coffee, sweets, and cakes", opened above the department store. However, John Little & Co., Robinsons & Co., G.H. Cafe and Arthur's Bar opposed the cafe's attempt to obtain a third-class license to operate, contending that the surrounding area was "already well served". However, the cafe noted that Robinson's and John Little's did not serve dinners and that the cafe was open till 10 pm, and the license was approved.

The Bank of China applied to the Rent Assessment Board on 1 October 1940 for permission to evict both Gian Singh and M. S. Ally, as well as a cigarette stall, seeking to relocate their offices into the building. The bank explained that it had grown to such an extent that it had four times as many staff as it had in 1936 and that the Cecil Street premises was "hardly adequate". They noted that the building had previously been a bank and would thus serve as a suitable premises, and that they were willing to give both tenants until at least December and potentially longer to vacate the premises. The lease on its Cecil Street premises was then set to expire on 31 May the following year. M. S. Ally contested this by claiming that been in "undisturbed possession of the premises for 28 years and the profits of the store went to support a large number of families in India", and that the bank had "put the rent up considerably" and "made a large profit" since 1937. The store claimed to be well-known and patronised by Europeans in the country, and that it would be "almost impossible for them to find other suitable accommodation without affecting their business considerably." The applications against Gian Singh and M. S. Ally were rejected. However, the cigarette stall was evicted, and the board gave the bank permission to submit another application against Gian Singh in March 1941 if deemed necessary.

=== Legal dispute ===
Both M. S. Ally and Gian Singh remained open for business during the Japanese Occupation of Singapore, which lasted from 1942 to 1945. By July 1943, the Mutsumi Restaurant was established in the building. Following the end of the occupation, the building was one of many to be requisitioned by the British Army. The army vacated the premises on 22 November 1946. By that month, the bank had given both Gian Singh and M. S. Ally until 15 January to vacate the premises as they wished to demolish the structure to erect a 14-storey building, though the company had applied for a two months extension. While Gian Singh had acquired 30 Raffles Place and 30-1 Raffles Place, the former property required around six to seven months of repairs before it would be ready for occupation. They had also applied for 26 Raffles Place and announced their intentions to acquire 132-136 Robinson Road from the Honkong and Shanghai Bank for their roughly 80 staff members, thus claiming to have "done everything possible to vacate their present premises." On the other hand, M. S. Ally claimed to have sought to acquire 24 and 25 Raffles Place, but that these buildings would not be ready for occupation until March. It was claimed that they "had done everything that was possible to obtain other accommodation.

However, both applications were rejected in January by the Rent Board, which ruled that both stores were to move out by the 15th. On the 14th, goods worth $30,000 in total were stolen from Gian Singh's new premises at 31 Raffles Place. They claimed on the same day to have been unable to completely relocate as the military had yet to derequisition 31-1 Raffles Place, leaving them without enough space for their goods. On 15 January, both Gian Singh and M. S. Ally decided to "squat" in the building, despite having their water and electricity cut. The day after, Gian Singh begun transporting their goods to the godown at the rear of 30-1 Raffles Place, which was being derequisitioned by the Navy, Army and Air Force Institute and was still undergoing renovations. M. S. Ally was still unable to move elsewhere as both 24 and 25 Raffles Place had yet to be derequisitioned. The first floor had by then been completely cleared by labourers, and the bank had already called tenders for the demolition of the building, though water and electricity had been restored after both stores appealed to the President of the Municipal Commission Lazarus Rayman.

In February, the bank filed a lawsuit against both stores, seeking possession of the property, $950 a month from 5 December and 'costs'. Gian Singh then claimed that their premises were around a fortnight away from being ready for occupation. By 10 February, M. S. Ally had finally moved out, and Gian Singh claimed that they planned on moving out by 1 March, with most of their stock already having been relocated to Raffles Place. The Singapore Free Press then reported that this "[seemed] to have ended Singapore's 'squat' drama enacted by two well-known firms in the city." However, Hardial Singh appeared before court later that month as Gian Singh had yet to vacate the premises. In early March, Singh filed a lawsuit against the bank, hoping to have the eviction order "quashed". By then, a criminal charge had been placed on him for ignoring the order, though this "[would] not arise" if he could successfully dispute the order. Gian Singh's new premises on Raffles Place opened officially on 15 March, after which they finally vacated Battery Road. Demolition of the building took place nearly two months after, after which work on the Bank of China Building began.
