= Flint's Building =

Building in Singapore

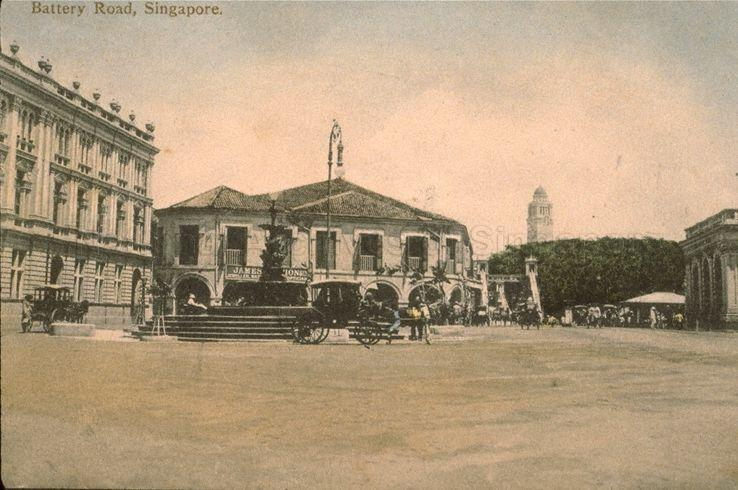
- Flint's Building at Fullerton Square around 1900. To its left, across Flint Street, is the Chartered Bank Building. Slightly visible on the right is the General Post Office
- Interactive map of the Flint's Building area

General information
- Coordinates: 1.3089°N 103.8526°E
- Demolished: 1913
- Owner: Flint family

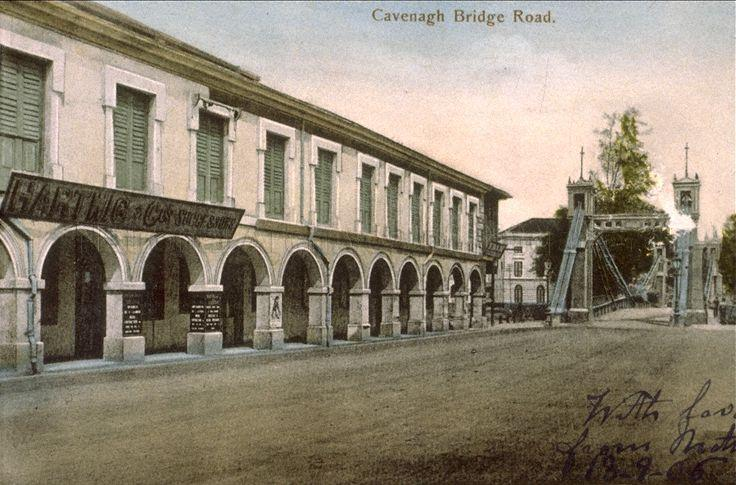
The front on Cavenagh Bridge Road leading up to Cavenagh Bridge, c. 1900

Flint's Building, also known as Flint's Block, Flint's Godown, Flint's Estate or the Cavenagh Bridge Buildings was a landmark which wrapped around the corners of Battery Road and Flint Street and Battery Road and Cavenagh Bridge Road. Owned by the Flint family, it housed the Emmerson's Tiffin Rooms, a popular restaurant frequented by seafarers. Its occupants also included clock and watchmakers J. Motion & Co., shipchandlers and sailmakers, and the offices of surveying and architectural firm Swan & Lermit. The building was demolished in 1913 to make way for the Whiteaway Laidlaw Building.

== Description ==
The two-storey structure was bounded by Flint Street, Battery Road, the road leading up to the Cavenagh Bridge and the Singapore River. It was a "long rambling" block which comprised a row of houses or godowns. It was divided in half by a "subtantial" brick wall, with one half fronting Battery Road and Fullerton Square and the other facing the river. The Cavenagh Bridge Road front faced onto the General Post Office Building, while the Flint Street front faced onto the McAlister Building, which was demolished in 1893 and replaced in 1895 by the Chartered Bank Building. There was a verandah which ran the length of the frontage.

== History ==
In the first half of the 1860s, buildings "superior to any which had previously graced the town" and "which must of themselves create a large traffic along their frontage" were erected by the Flint family on what was once a "waste of bare ground" along Flint Street. In 1866, veterinarian Charles Emmerson founded the Emmerson's Tiffin Rooms, a "very popular lunch-time spot" frequented by seafarers, including writer Joseph Conrad on his visits to Singapore. In 1868, the godowns of Virgin & Co., which were near the centre of the Flint's Building's situated on the ground floor and just below Emmerson's Tiffin Rooms, caught on fire. This event was retrospectively described as "more smoke than fire." The firm then vacated the premises, after which they were replaced by shipchandlers and sailmakers Jaimie, Wynd & Co. on 1 October. Around 1870, a new road, leading up to the newly-built Cavenagh Bridge and running along the east side of the building, which included the godowns occupied by Emmerson and Jaimie, Wynd & Co., was built and named Cavenagh Bridge Road.

A small fire started in the premises of Jamie, Wynd & Co., by then Jamie & Co., on the evening of 5 November 1875, though it was quickly put out before it could spread to the "large quantity of oil and other inflammable material". A larger fire was started in the same premises on the night of 2 May 1877. The fire signal was only given past 2 am on 3 May, thought it was thought that the fire "must have been smouldering for hours before." It spread "from below upwards, and from the centre of the godown towards the river." The premises of Jamie & Co. and Emmerson's Tiffin Rooms were completely gutted, though the brick wall, in addition to a lack of wind and an "abundant supply of water close at hand", allowed for the fire to be put out before it could spread beyond the river-fronting half of the block. Goods in the McAlister Building across Flint Street were also removed, as it was initially feared that the fire would spread across the street. It was the fourth fire in the town in that month. Watch and clockmakers and opticians J. Motion & Co. moved their offices into the building by July. By January 1880, shipchandlers Drummond, Gaggino & Co. had also relocated their offices to the premises.

On the night of 21 December 1880, a fire broke out at the McAlister Building, which initially threatened to spread to the Flint's Building, which would have led to "almost insignificant losses to its occupants", in particular J. Motion & Co., with the "valuable nature of its stock". A small fire engine from the brigade founded by Loh Kee Seng, among the first to arrive in the area, was successful in preventing the fire from spreading across Flint Street. However, several businesses in the building still suffered losses through water damage or breakage. These tenants included J. Motion & Co., Hartwig & Co. and J. M. Lyon & Co. Another fire broke out in the area in January 1883 at the Ross & Sons godown, which ran from Battery Road to Boat Quay. This time, the Flint's Building was protected by the crew of the Champion, who "devoted themselves energetically" to save the structure by pulling down the sunshades on the windows facing onto the fire and keeping the slates wet from the roof, which "could not have been done earlier, as the slates would have slivered and chipped, and exposed the planking underneath to certain destruction." In early 1884, there were rumours that the government sought to acquire the property. However, this was reportedly "without foundation". The architectural partnership between Archibald Alexander Swan and Alfred William Lermit, Swan & Maclaren predecessor Swan & Lermit, was founded in Flint's Building in early 1888. The Tanjong Pagar Land Company, which acquired land for reclamation in Tanjong Pagar, was founded at the building in November 1889.

By March 1901, it had been decided that the bridges along the Singapore River were to be raised. The government then proposed that the Municipal Commissioners begin with Cavenagh Bridge and suggested that they also consider, as an alternative, rebuilding the bridge or erecting an entirely new bridge. The commissioners proposed that the Flint's Building be acquired by the municipality and pulled down to make way for a new, wider bridge with two approaches, one from Battery Road and the other from Boat Quay. While this was considered "advisable", the President of the commission noted that the commission then had "limited" borrowing powers, and thus were not able to procure the funds necessary to acquire the property. In November the Commission announced their plans to rebuild Cavenagh Bridge in a scheme which was to "interfere" with the building's Cavenagh Bridge Road frontage. William Dunman moved his offices into the building by May 1904. The journalist Arthur Howell was a resident of the building from the mid-1900s until his death in 1907. By May 1910 it was "one of the most used verandah ways" on the island, though the paving was particularly poorly-maintained, with several holes "of considerable extent, several inches deep."

Towards the end of its lifespan, the Flint's Building had come to be seen as "humble". British department store chain Whiteaway, Laidlaw & Company acquired the property from the Flint family in the middle of 1913 with the intent of pulling down the structure and erecting a new premises "appropriate to the large demands of their trade and conserved for their exclusive use." The building's tenants, which then included, at the "foremost", Motion & Co., Gaggino & Co., Lloyd's Registry and Dr. Williams' Pink Pills, were given until the end of October to vacate the premises, after which the building was demolished. Singapore Free Press And Mercantile Advertiser opined in December that its "gradual" demolition demonstrated how "desirable it would [have been] — save for the cost — to keep that plot of ground open, from an aesthetic point of view." The Flint's Building was among several old landmarks in Singapore demolished around that time, along with the Alhambra Theatre and the Dispensary Building. It was replaced by the Whiteaway Laidlaw Building, completed in 1915.
