= Charles Emmerson (restaurateur) =

Restaurateur, hotel proprietor and veterinarian (died 1883)

Charles Emmerson (1835 or 1836 – 2 June 1883) was a prominent U.S.-born restaurateur, hotel proprietor and veterinarian in Singapore. He was the first veterinary surgeon to practice on the island.

== Early life and education ==
Emmerson was born in the United States. He spent four years studying at the Royal Veterinary College in London, England.

== Career ==
Emmerson came to Singapore in October 1860 and established a successful veterinary business in Raffles Place. He was the first veterinary surgeon to practice on the island. In 1864, he began selling several drinks, including soda water. In 1866, he established the restaurant Emmerson's Tiffin Rooms in the Flint's Building near the Cavenagh Bridge. It featured a large billiard room and sold tiffin lunches and beverages, as well as cigars and newspapers from the United States, the United Kingdom and elsewhere in Europe. Emmerson kept a box of unpaid bills labelled "for sale" in the restaurant. He often entertained his customers by making jokes and telling comedic stories. Novelist Joseph Conrad dined there while on his frequent trips to Singapore. It is believed that Conrad met sea captain William Lingard, who would serve as the inspiration for a recurring character in Conrad's works, at Emmerson's Tiffin Rooms. British explorer Frederick William Burbidge praised the restaurant's curries, salads and selection of newspapers. The restaurant was badly damaged in a fire on 4 May 1877 and subsequently rebuilt by Emmerson. It was again badly damaged in a fire in April 1889.

In 1867, Emmerson opened the Clarendon Hotel on Beach Road. The hotel was the first in Singapore to feature a pavilion for bachelors, a bar and a billiard room. An 1869 article in the China Telegraph noted that it was "very clean and well managed". However, Emmerson sold the hotel in 1873. He returned to the hotel as owner in 1877. The Clarendon closed in the same year. Later that year, he opened the Emmerson's Hotel, which occupied a bungalow on Beach Road leased from merchant Syed Omar bin Mohamed Alsagoff. He would frequently personally tour Singapore with the hotel's guests. The hotel closed by January 1883. The building was then used as a boarding house for Raffles Institution before the Sarkies Brothers converted it into the Raffles Hotel.

Emmerson was also a popular amateur actor and comedian. He was a member of the Savage Club, an amateur theatrical group, from 1861 to its closure in 1863, after which he continued performing with several other theatrical groups in Singapore. Tickets to his performances were usually sold at Emmerson's Tiffin Rooms. In a review of a Telegraph Dramatic Club production which he took part in, The Straits Times wrote: "Emmerson's confidence on the stage was unlimited, and he not only gave an impression, an excellent one, on his written part, but like a man of humour he improved upon any occasion which gave him an advantage and introduced some bye play and impromptu which were thoroughly appreciated." The review also praised his "good" voice. Additionally, he frequently gave visiting performers advice and assistance with promoting productions in Singapore.

Emmerson served as the director of a gold mining company, a member of the Straits Branch of the Royal Asiatic Society and the clerk of the Serangoon Road Race Course. He was also a Freemason.

== Personal life and death ==
Emmerson married Maria Moss in 1861. They had two daughters and one son. He died on 2 June 1883 at his residence on River Valley Road following a week-long fever. Following his death, ownership of Emmerson's Tiffin Rooms was taken over by one of his daughters. However, it was sold following another major fire in 1886. It was eventually closed in 1906.
