= Exchange Building, Singapore =

Historic building in Singapore

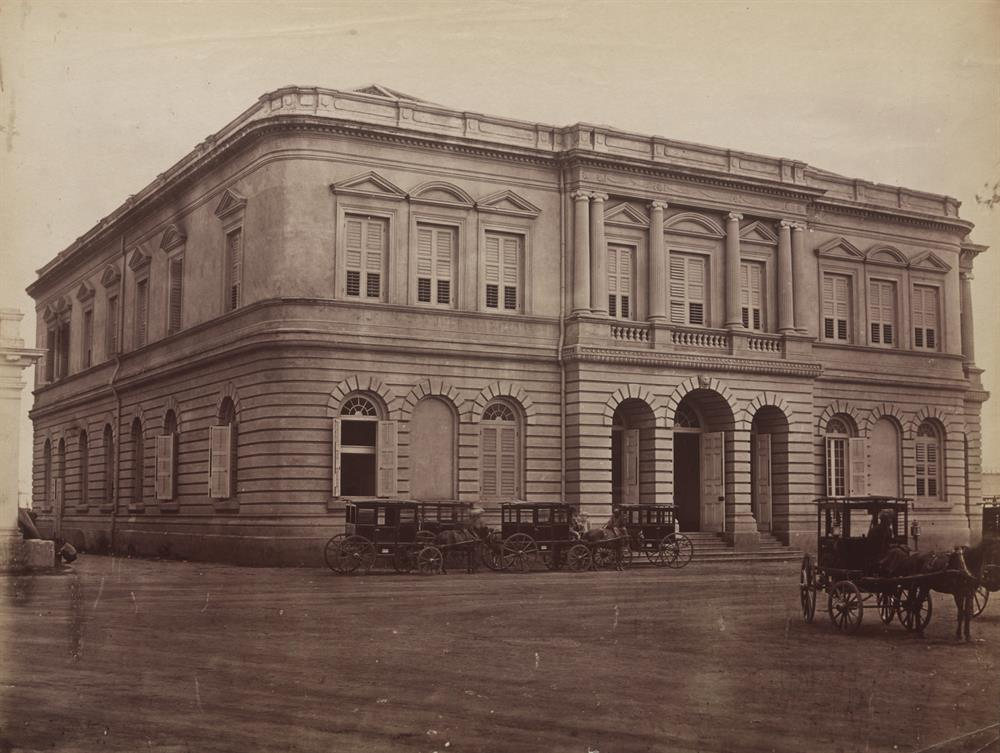
- The Exchange Building in the 1890s

General information
- Coordinates: 1.28646°N 103.85306°E
- Opened: 29 September 1879
- Demolished: Early April 1926
- Cost: $45,000

Technical details
- Floor count: 2

Design and construction
- Architect: William Daniel Bayliss

The Exchange Building was a landmark on Collyer Quay in Singapore. Completed in 1879, it was erected on the former site of Fort Fullerton and housed the Exchange Rooms of the Singapore Exchange and the Singapore Chamber of Commerce on the ground floor, with the Singapore Club occupying the floor above. It was demolished in 1926, along with the rest of the block, to make way for the new premises of the General Post Office, later known as the Fullerton Building.

== Description ==
The two-storey structure, described as "one of the ornaments of Singapore", had its principal frontage on Cavenagh Bridge Road while "[showing] out prominently from the harbour." Elaborate ornamentation "[had] not been attempted" on the structure, which was described as an "honest piece of worksmanship". Features of the façade included cornices and architraves. There was a verandah which ran along the south-west corner, facing onto and initially overlooking the waterfront. The structure was still considered "commodious" in the late 1900s.

The main entrance opened onto the 45ft by 50ft main Entrance Hall which featured tesselated tiles. A staircase here, fitted with a handrail painted blue and gold with cast-iron balusters, led to the upper floor. A bronze bust of Sir Andrew Clarke, the Governor of the Straits Settlements from 1873 to 1875, was placed here. The ground floor housed the Commerce Chamber and the Exchange Room, which were 60ft by 30ft and 55ft by 30ft, respectively, accompanied by the Secretaries' Offices which were 22ft by 15ft each. There were also four offices, each 22ft by 14ft. There was another entrance hall and staircase at the rear, and this was accompanied by a lift, as well as the lavatories. The Chamber of Commerce later shifted its main entrance to the rear entrance hall, leaving the former main entrance as the private entrance to the Singapore Club only.

The upper floor was occupied entirely by the Singapore Club. The staircase from the main entrance led to a front gallery, which in turn led to the dining, billiard and reading rooms. These were fitted with new furniture "in keeping with the building", with sun lights installed in each and two table lights placed in the billiard room, which featured three full-length tables. There was a kitchen, provided with a "range capable of cooking for 150 persons" and adjoined by the dishing up rooms and scullery. Other amenities included the Wine and Linen rooms and the Bar and Serving rooms, as well as the Lavatories and the Dressing and Bath rooms which were "fitted with every convenience". Several rooms featured gas fittings selected by the energetic manager of the Singapore Gas Company. A 1900 guidebook noted that the club was "distinguished" for its "splendid" view of the waterfront and the "tasteful arrangement of its spacious dining and conversation rooms."

== History ==
=== Background and planning ===
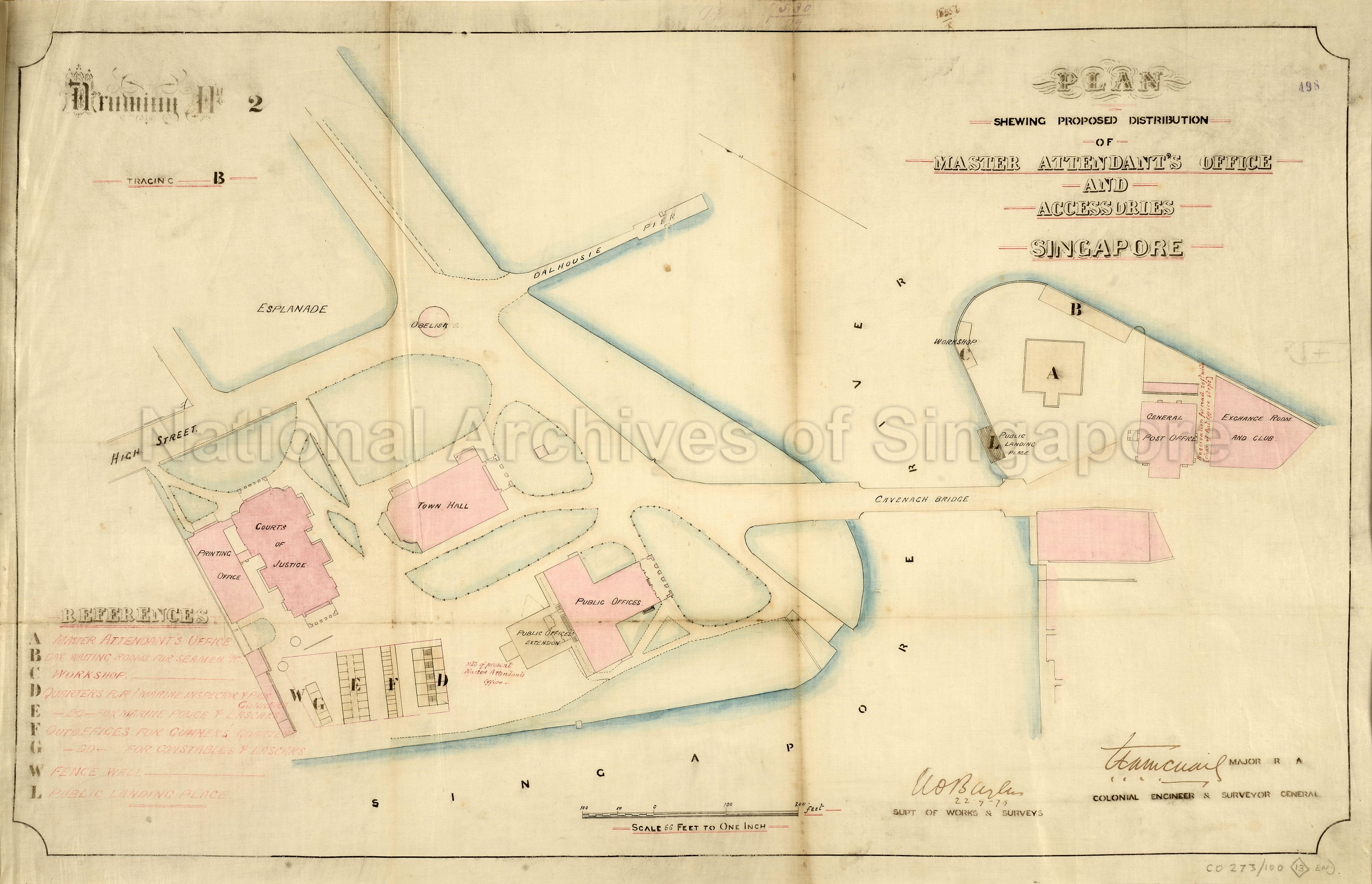
1879 plan of town centre depicting the site of the Exchange Building.

The committee of the Singapore Chamber of Commerce had begun to consider the construction of a new premises. In February 1877, the government "very liberally" leased a plot of land along the waterfront at Collyer Quay to Gulland & Adamson at a rate of $150 a year. This plot was situated next to Johnston's Pier and the single-storied first Post Office on the Western side of the former Fort Fullerton, which had been demolished by the early 1870s. Gulland & Adamson were acting on behalf of the chamber and the Singapore Exchange, who sought to erect a building which was to serve as their premises. Members of the chamber and the exchange were appointed to the project's Building Committee. Part of the building was also to house the premises of the Singapore Club, the "premier" club on the island.

The Straits Times opined then that there was "no site in town more suitable and convenient in every way for a Club than Fort Fullerton." It was one of several buildings the local government sought to erect in that area, which was set to become the "busiest and most important corner of Singapore town." The Straits Times then suggested that the government and committee consider the building having three storeys as opposed to two as was planned. There were then concerns over the Building Committee's ability to "fully [consider] the requirements and necessary accommodation for a Club, such as will be creditable" to Singapore, with the Straits Times reporting that the committee's members largely "[cared] nothing for a club" and would "restrict the accommodation as much as possible, so as to make it as much of a mere tiffin room as it is at present."

The architect was engineer William Daniel Bayliss of the Public Works Department. Construction was to cost $30,000, with both organisations having already set $10,000 aside for this purpose. Another $10,000 was to be raised through bonds of $100 with 6% interest, and the rest of the cost was to be recouped through annual rental income, then estimated to be $4,080. The estimated cost of the works was then raised by $5,000 to account for "contingencies". It was then expected that nearly half of the income was to come from club members, with the Club set to pay $2,000 in rent. The Straits Times felt that the committee was "counting their chickens before they are hatched" due to the lack of consideration given to the club in planning the premises, urging the committee to reconsider the plan such as to better accommodate the club. The plans were approved in May and by the end of the month the financial arrangements were "well advanced", with the foundation stone soon to be laid. In September, the committee awarded a contract for the erection of the structure, then to be known as the New Exchange Buildings, for $34,000. The Straits Times reported in August 1878 that the building, then under construction, had already formed "such a contrast" to the Post Office next door that it had been proposed that that building be expanded to include a second floor.

=== Opening and reputation ===
"Rapid progress" had been made on the structure by June 1879, though it was then reported that the building would not be immediately occupied on its completion. The date on which the chamber, exchange and club were to move in was to be decided to some level by the "degree of support met with by the Building Committee in their efforts to induce others to follow the example set by most of the houses in the place" through the erection of a building which was as "ornamental to the town" as it was "serviceable to those for whose use it [was] primarily intended." The building was officially opened without a formal ceremony was opened on 29 September. It was then described in the Straits Times as a "handome structure, in which every convenience is afforded" and an "imposing addition to the public buildings of Singapore." The cost of erecting the building was then reported as $45,000; this figure did not include the cost of the furniture. The completion of the structure was retrospectively described as one of several events of "some importance" in Singapore which served as "tokens of progress" in 1879, alongside the completion of the Masonic Hall and the Albert Dock in Tanjong Pagar, as well as the commencement of the construction of Outram Prison. In the following year, the Singapore Club officially relocated to the Exchange Building from its former premises on Finlayson Green, which then became the Behn Meyer Building. The club, exchange and chamber then paid $175, $100 and $25 a month, respectively, in rent.

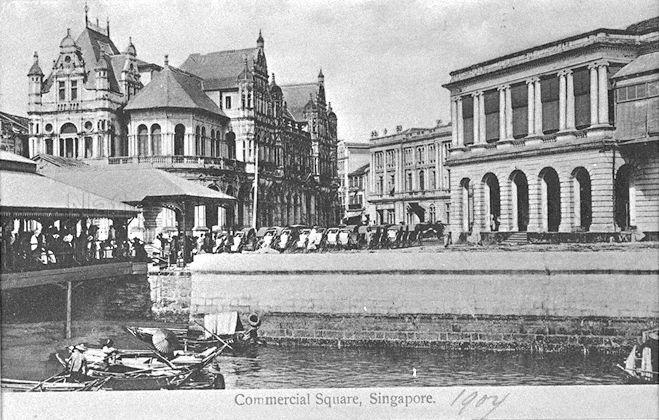
The Exchange Building (right) with its verandah along Collyer Quay in the 1900s. Also visible are, from left to right, Johnston's Pier, the Hongkong and Shanghai Bank Building and the Chartered Bank Building.

In September 1881, the government accepted an offer from the Chamber of Commerce to lease part of the ground floor to the Post Office for $50 a month. The building served as the office's temporary premises as the General Post Office next door underwent redevelopment. The Head Office of the Straits Insurance Company were located in the building in the 1880s and the early 1890s. The Straits Times Weekly reported in December 1884 that tourists in Singapore would be "agreeably impressed with the outward grandeur" of the Exchange Building and the new General Post Office. In February 1885, the Legislative Council of the Straits Settlements introduced a bill which was to vest the property to the chairmen of the chamber and the exchange without requiring a transfer whenever there was a change in the chairmen, a process which had proven costly and inconvenient as both positions saw frequent transfers. Businessman John Fraser moved his offices into the building by August 1890. It was reported in October 1891 that almost all of the exchange's income of $6,605.56 for the past year came from rent in the building.

The landmark was included in George Murray Reith's 1892 Handbook to Singapore, in which it is described as a "handsome building" with "spacious and cool verandahs." The Straits Times described the Exchange Building in 1897 as "one of the finest buildings fronting the sea", with a verandah that served as the "redezvous of the jaded merchant, banker, and professional man, after the heat and burden of the day have been borne." In 1898, an application had been made to install a sun and rain shade over the Singapore Club, and it was ruled that this would only be granted if it could be demonstrated that the walls of the building did not project 4ft or more into the street. It was proposed in 1900 that the 100ft-long front facing the sea be extended 50ft over the water, with the verandah having been constructed to account for such a potential extension. This would introduce 5,000ft of additional floor space on each floor, and it had already been assessed that such an extension "would in no way interfere with navigation or anchorage ground or anything of the kind." This arrangement would have benefitted the club especially, which would be able to expand its billiard and dining rooms and "allow the membership to be increased by a large number." A 1909 guidebook by Charlton Bristow Perkins wrote that the club's "attractive Tiffin room, reading room and billiard rooms [were] among the finest in Asia."

=== Demolition ===
In 1918, a committee was formed by the government to decide on a site for a new General Post Office, which remained a "crying need". Although the Post Office had already been rebuilt, and this newer post office had received several extensions over the years, it could not keep up with the ever-growing operations of the local postal department. The government then decided on shifting the post office to the Government House across the Singapore River, which would require "very considerable and extensive alterations" that the committee felt would be "totally unsuitable." The present General Post Office was to be replaced by the Secretariat's Offices. The committee unanimously opposed this proposal, viewing that it would be a "most retrograde step" to relocate the post office away from its "most convenient and central site."

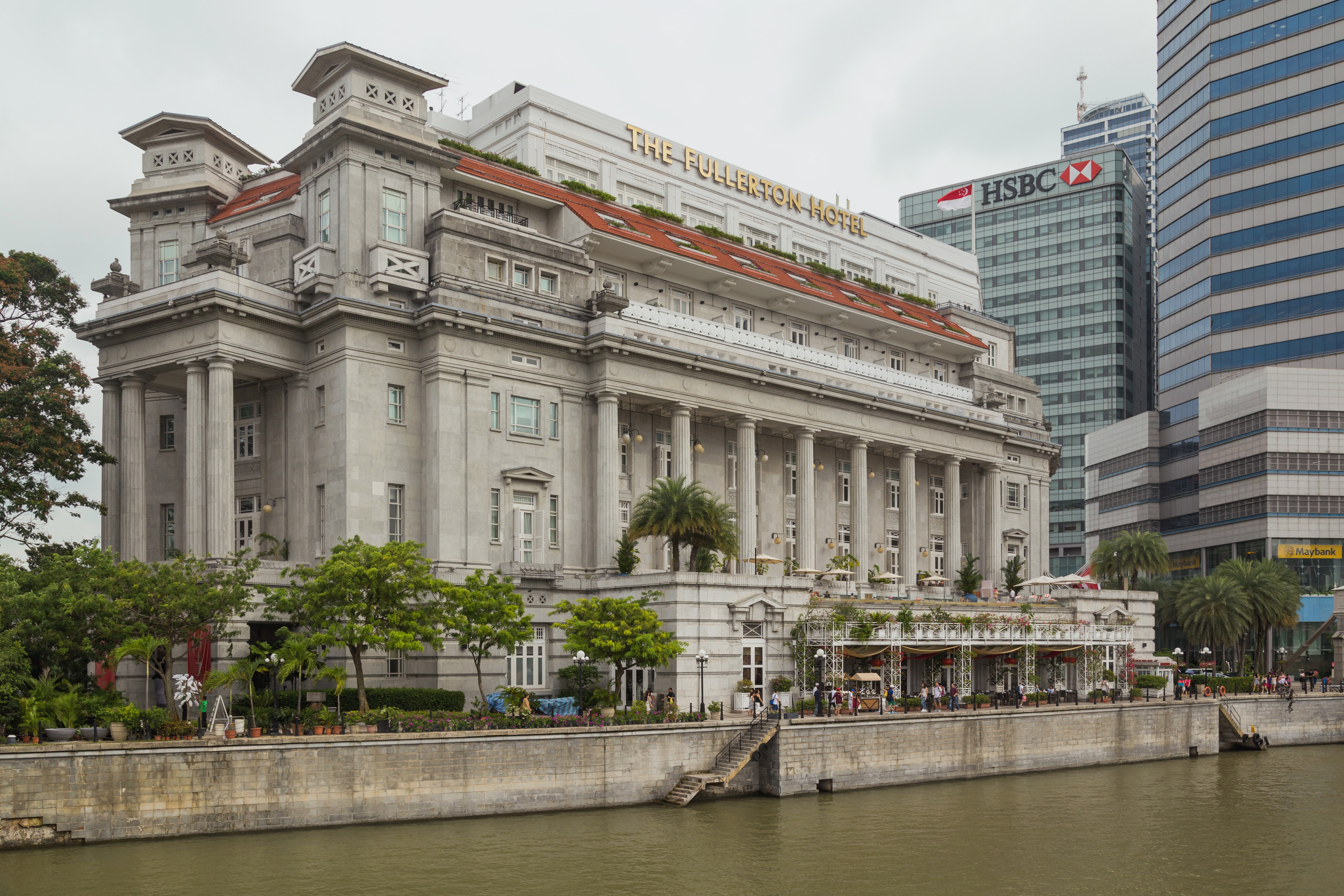
The new General Post Office, also known as the Fullerton Building, in 2016. It housed the Singapore Club, the Chamber of Commerce and the Exchange Rooms.

The local government announced in March 1919 that it instead planned to demolish the General Post Office, along with the rest of the block in which it stood, to make way for a "commodious" and "up-to-date" structure for the post office. This included the Exchange Building, which was to make way largely for "street improvement", and as such did not need to be vacated as quickly as the other structures marked for demolition. The new building would also house the Singapore Club, as well as the offices of the Master Attendant, the Port Health Officer and the Marine Surveyor. The Master Attendant's Office and Shipping Office were also to make way. The Chamber of Commerce and the Exchange Rooms were to be relocated elsewhere. The committee officially proposed this the month after. Government architect Percy Hubert Keys had drawn up the plans for the new building by September.

In July, the local government announced, in response to an application made by the chamber for a plot of land on which its new premises was to be erected, that it would grant one of two available plots on a 99-year lease for $150 a year, on the condition that the chamber's committee would "for all time" comprise only British subjects, that the chamber "waive all claims of compensation" for the existing building, that the new building be erected within four years at a cost of $250,000 or greater, and that it include a rubber auction room, trade sample rooms and offices "pertaining thereto and for no other purpose without special permission in writing of the Government. Additionally, the government could take over the property at any time "free of cost" if it was decided that the land was "required for public purpose", though if this took place before 31 January 1979, the chamber would receive the compensation they had previously waived. These were considered "very generous terms" by the committee, who felt that any challenges posed by the scheme were "by no means of an unsurmountable character." A joint sub-committee comprising members of the Chamber of Commerce and Exchange and the Chamber of Commerce Rubber Association was to deliberate the financing of the scheme.

The Straits Times reported in February 1924 that the demolition of the Exchange Building had been delayed due to the "difficulty" in finding "suitable accommodation" for the exchange and the club. The building would only be torn down after the larger portion of the new Post Office was completed. In September, the chamber and exchange were informed that the Exchange Building was to be demolished in about 15 months and that both organisations would be temporarily housed in the completed portion before the completion of the new building as a whole, when they would be moved elsewhere in the structure. Tenders for the demolition were called in early April 1926, in conjunction with the club's vacation of the premises. It was pulled down shortly after. The new Post Office, which came to be known as the Fullerton Building, was officially opened in July 1928, partially occupied by the Singapore Club, the Singapore Chamber of Commerce and the Singapore Exchange.
