= General Post Office, Singapore =

Demolished building in Singapore

General Post Office
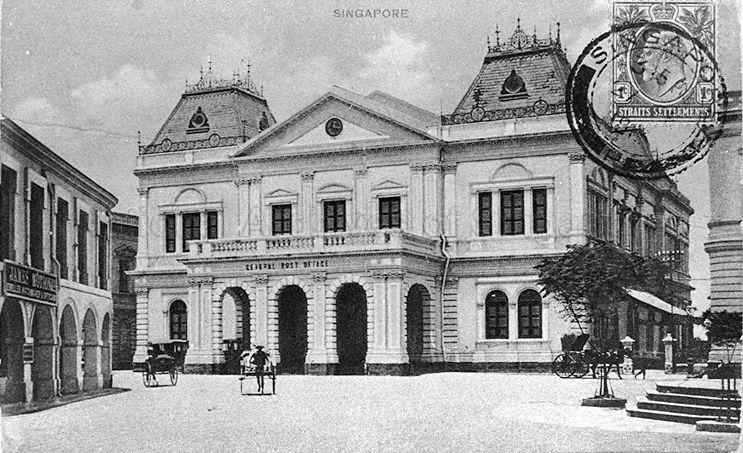
- The General Post Office c. 1900. Flint's Building is visible on the left and to the right is the Exchange Building

General information
- Coordinates: 1.28654°N 103.85305°E
- Year built: 1
- Construction started: April 1883; 143 years ago
- Opened: 13 October 1884; 142 years ago
- Demolished: 16 July 1922; 104 years ago

Height
- Height: 13 metres (43 ft)

Technical details
- Size: 44 × 29 metres (145 × 95 feet)
- Floor count: 2

Design and construction
- Engineer: Henry McCallum

The General Post Office was a landmark at Fullerton Square in Singapore. Completed in 1884, it replaced the first General Post Office, which was already running out of space a decade after its completion, and housed the local General Post Office Department. However, the department also quickly outgrew this building, which received numerous extensions and alterations that were unable to solve the issue. It was demolished in 1922 to make way for the Fullerton Building.

== Description ==
The then-"immense" two-storey structure was described in The Straits Times as "imposing" with a façade that was "equalled by its internal arrangement and ornamentation." The building was 145ft long and 95ft wide, as well as 44ft in height, with the ground floor being 21ft tall and the one above being 23ft tall. It featured pilasters and a Corinthian order, with a mansard at each corner of the roof which was "intended to break the skyline" and "improve" the appearance of the building in a "harmonious manner." A clock manufactured by Gillett & Co. in England was installed on the façade. There were three entrances; the main entrance in front, an entrance from the verandah and the backdoor.

The main entrance led to an open and "broad" two-storey hall, with verandahs extending out from either side, while the secondary entrance led to the side offices. The floor was paved with tesselated "Malacca tiles", of "sombre" colouring, and the walls were lined up to breast height with white glazed tiles accompanied by a "narrow" blue border. The gallery on the first floor offices "[extended] all round and [commanded] the whole lower office and the side rooms, so that every clerk [was] directly under surveillance." The offices themselves were fitted with sorting boxes fitted with brass. Wire railings of gilded brass accompanied the counters at the windows. The side office housed the Dutch mail sorter, and the mailroom was at the back. There were "broad" staircases on either side of the main hall; one led to the Postmaster General's office and the living quarters of the chief clerk and family. The latter was to have a kitchen, bathrooms and "all other requisites". Behind the building were the stables and syces' quarters.

== History ==
=== Background and construction ===
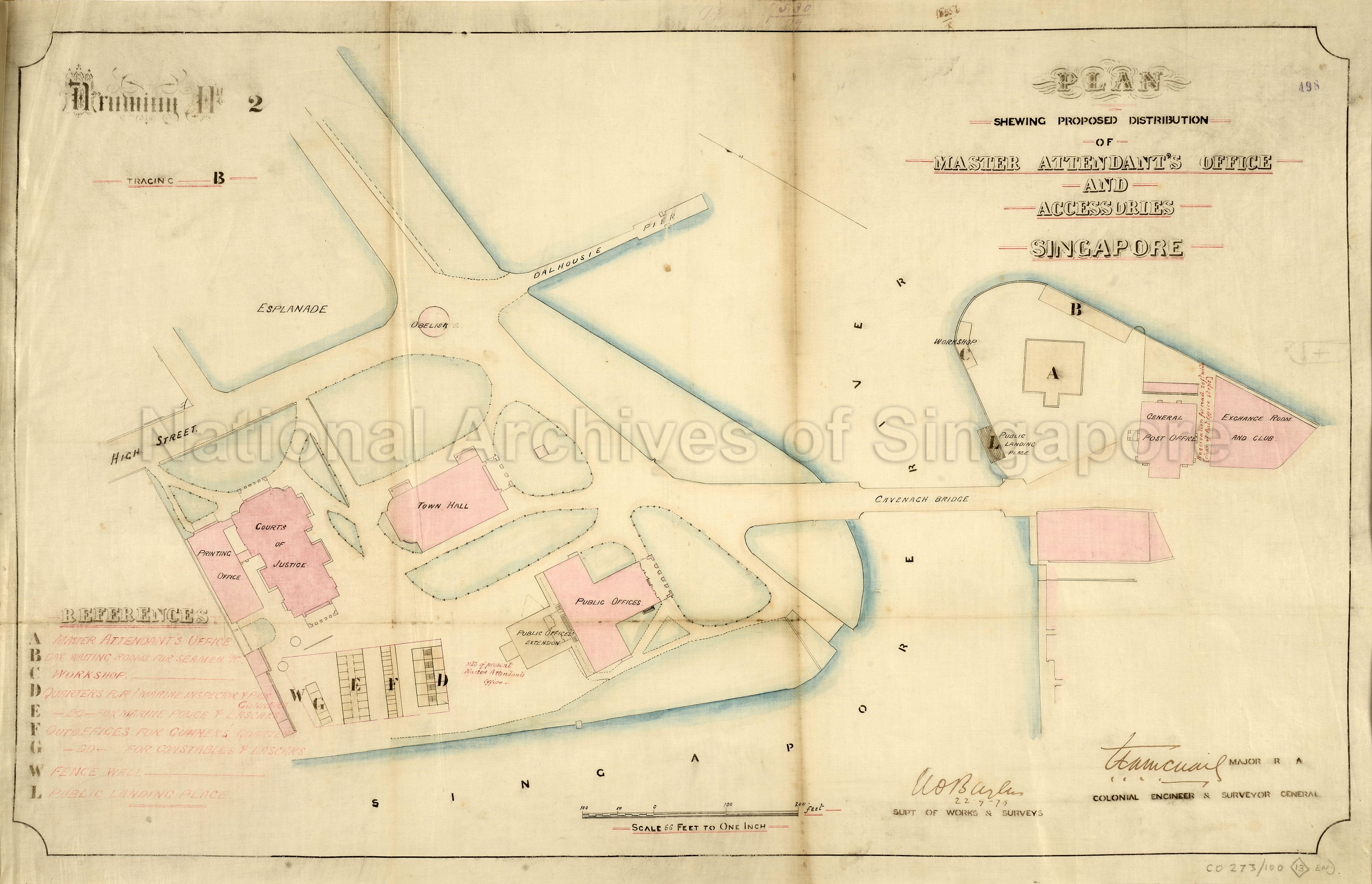
1879 plan of town centre depicting the site of the Post Office.

In April 1882, the Colonial Secretary of the Straits Settlements, Cecil Clementi Smith, proposed at a meeting of the Legislative Council that the government erect a new General Post Office in Singapore. The previous plan had been to expand the old Post Office, built on the former site of Fort Fullerton in 1874, to account for the expansion of the department's operations. Smith argued that doing so would only "make the building sufficient for immediate purposes", while the operations would only continue to expand. As such, he believed that the government should instead demolish the old building and construct a larger building, which would account for the future growth of the post office. The acting Colonial Engineer, Henry McCallum, had already come to this conclusion and had drawn up plans for a new premises. This motion was unanimously agreed to by the council. McCallum's style was reportedly "evident in every line" of the plans.

The General Post Office had temporarily relocated elsewhere by February 1883 such that the old post office could be pulled down. The land on which the temporary premises stood was granted to the Singapore Rowing Club afterwards for the erection of a new boathouse. Work on the new Post Office had begun by April. It was nearing completion by March 1884 and it was to house living quarters for the officer in charge of the office in addition to providing more space for the "growing" department. In May, Legislative Councillor Isaac Swinburne Bond questioned the inclusion of mansard roofs in the design, calling them "peculiar erections". In response, the acting Colonial Secretary, Allan Maclean Skinner, explained the concept of a mansard roof and noted that Bond himself had previously proclaimed that the plans for the building, which included the roofs, "seemed to promise a very handsome building with sufficient accommodation." It was initially anticipated that the building would be ready for occupation by 28 September, though by then there were still "finishing touches" that had to be made in the interior and so the opening ceremony was postponed by one or two weeks.

=== Opening and alterations ===
The new General Post Office was officially opened on 13 October and was then described as a "handsome and well appointed building." The Straits Times had several criticisms, noting that the clerks' windows were "too small for the amount of business they have to do", criticising the decision to use Malacca tiles which were "scarcely suitable for Post Office floors" as "any letter of paper falling on them, [was] sure to be soiled." The paper suggested diamond tiles in a black-and-white pattern, which would have been "more in keeping with the surroundings" and "added to the cleanliness of the place." The amenities were "inconveniently arranged" for those who wished to send letters but did not have stamps on hand. However, it was noted that these "slight defects" could be dealt with "at no great expense", and that the building was an "ornament to the town." In March 1887, the windows in the front were being "considerably enlarged". The Straits Times noted that the Stamp Vendor's and Registration department's windows were also in need of enlargement and argued that it would be "well to make the job complete."

The offices of the Government Savings Bank, which later became the Post Office Savings Bank and was previously housed in the Treasury, moved to the General Post Office on 1 July 1889. It was repainted and whitewashed in early 1895. It was reported then that the post office had separate departments and counters for Europeans, Chinese, Malay and Indians, with special staff dedicated to each. In the Postmaster-General's Report for 1895, then Postmaster-General Noel Trotter complained that the lighting at the General Post Office was "so bad that it [was] with great difficulty the Clerks [could] see to do their work." He noted that a proposal to install "patent incandescent gas-burners" was rejected "on the score of expense." On the release of the report, Singapore Free Press and Mercantile Advertiser condemned the government's decision to refuse the proposal, opining: "Blow the expense, Sirs; do your duty. Economy is false if efficiency suffers." The paper criticised the local government for "rioting to excess in a perfect debauch of farthing-dip retrenchment." It later estimated that the installation of lighting in the building would instead reduce the building's operating costs and wrote that the rejection of the proposal had resulted in the "waste of money and time and temper and the energies of government officials." The Siam Observer felt that this "possibly [explained] why mails for Bangkok sometimes [went] astray" and suggested the raising of a "local subscription for presentation to the Singapore Government to meet the outlay on better light."

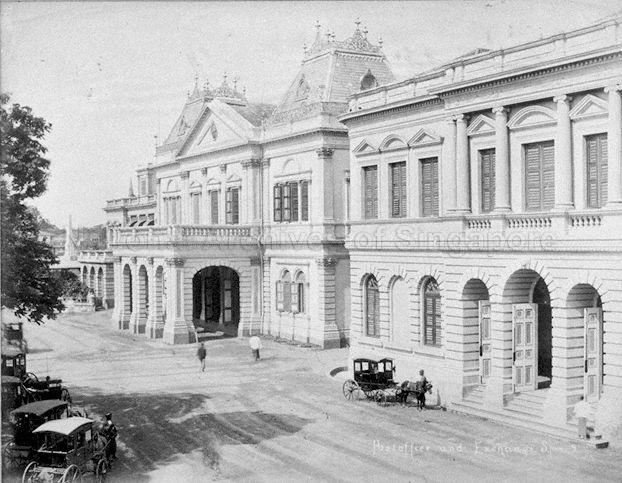
The General Post Office (left) next to the Exchange Building in around 1885

It was not until early 1897 that the first sub-post offices, aside from the Chinese Sub-Post Office, were established at Kandang Kerbau, Tanglin and Tanjong Pagar, with the last occupying part of the Tanjong Pagar Police Station. In September, it was proposed at a meeting of the Legislative Council that an iron pier be built between the General Post Office and the Master Attendant's Office. The lighting situation in the building had been "remedied" by early 1898. The roof of the building was damaged in a "violent gale" in March. The Straits Times reported in April 1900 that Trotter hoped for the Government to reserve a "first class site" on the newly reclaimed land at Telok Ayer for a new General Post Office, the construction of which was to be funded entirely by the sale of the current property to the Singapore Club or Singapore Exchange, both of which were housed in the next-door Exchange Building at a "moderate figure".

In October, the Legislative Council voted to enlarge the General Post Office, which had become "crowded" in its location. The works were to cost $28,500 and were only a "temporary makeshift, until some other time." It was suggested that a new Post Office be built elsewhere, though it was decided that this "would not meet with the views of the people." A year after, the council voted to allocate $3,500 for alterations and $2,000 on painting and colour-washing on the building. By November 1903, $500 had been allocated for the improvement of lighting at the building. Legislative Councillor George Sheppard Murray argued that this was too little as the office was "very imperfectly lighted", with candles "all over the place stuck into bottles". The amount of space at the General Post Office had grown so "inadequate" by the mid-1900s that there was not enough space for the sorting of parcel mails sent from the United Kingdom sent in Christmas 1905 and New Year's Day 1906. These had to be sorted in the nearby Singapore Volunteer Artillery Drill Hall. As such, plans for further expansion of the building were "under consideration" by August. The Straits Times reported in May of the following year that the "extraordinary growth" in the post office's operations had "congested" the building to such a point that further extensions were "necessary". In October 1909, the Rangoon Gazette opined that the General Post Office was among the few "imposing" structures in the city that could "lay claim to artistic merit." Extension works were once again underway at the General Post Office by September 1910.

=== Demolition ===
In 1918, a committee was formed by the government to decide on a site for a new General Post Office, which had become a "crying need". The government then decided on shifting the post office to the Government House across the Singapore River, which would require "very considerable and extensive alterations" that the committee felt would be "totally unsuitable." The present General Post Office was to be replaced by the Secretariat's Offices. The committee unanimously opposed this proposal, viewing that it would be a "most retrograde step" to relocate the post office away from its "most convenient and central site." A correspondent for the Straits Times opined in September that if a larger post office were to be built, it should also house the Shipping Office as the "congestion" at the office's then premises nearby was "terrible". The Shipping Office would also occupy the Exchange Building, with the correspondent suggesting that the Singapore Club be relocated to the old clubhouse of the Teutonia Club.

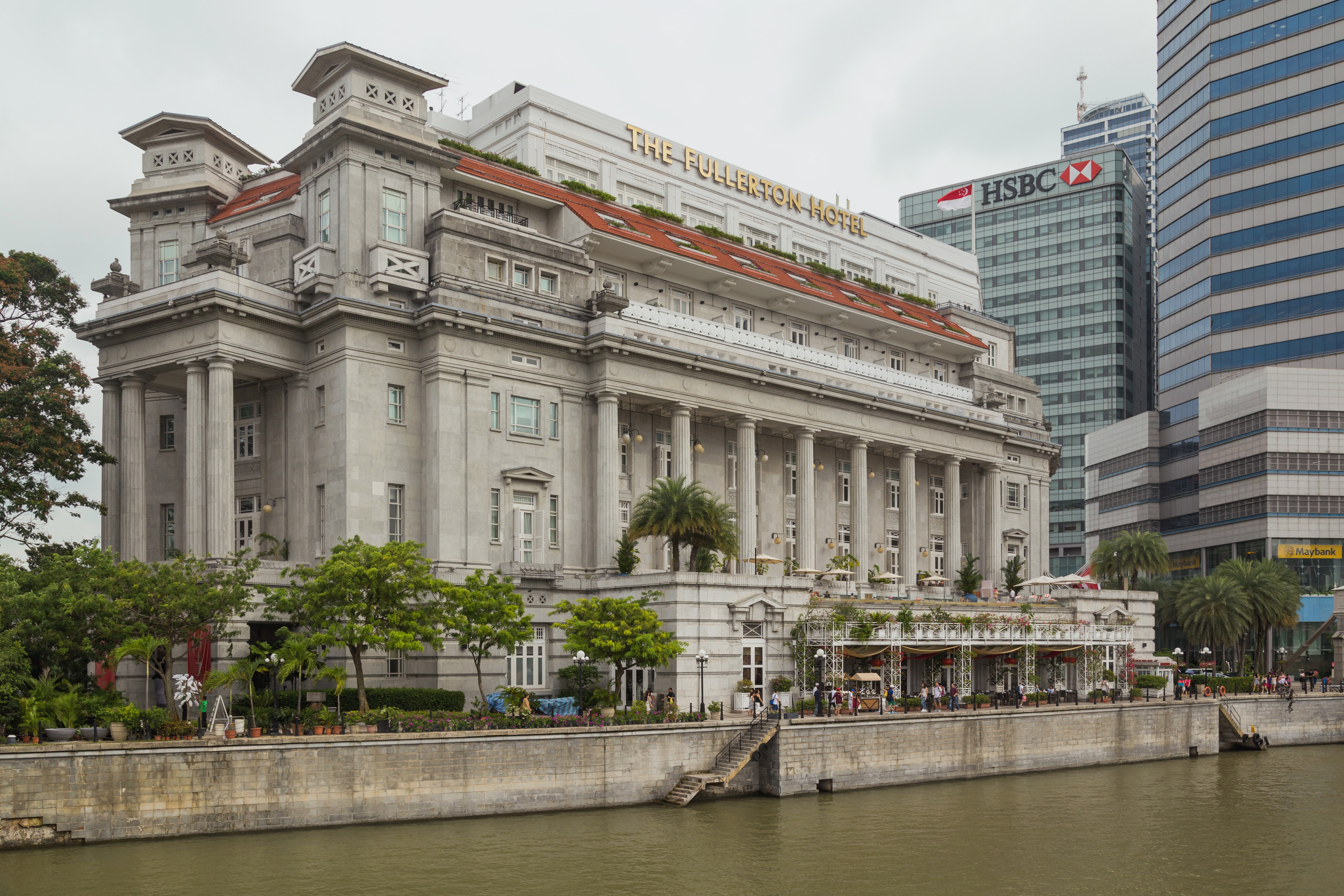
The new General Post Office, also known as the Fullerton Building, in 2016.

The local government announced in March 1919 that it planned to demolish the General Post Office, along with the rest of the block in which it stood, to make way for a "commodious" and "up-to-date" structure for the post office. The new building would also house the Singapore Club and the Exchange Rooms, with the Exchange Building also having to make way for this new structure, as well as the offices of the Master Attendant, the Port Health Officer and the Marine Surveyor. The Master Attendant's Office and the Shipping Office were also to make way. The committee officially proposed this the month after. Government architect Percy Hubert Keys had drawn up the plans for the new building by September. A temporary structure which was to house the General Post Office was erected on Collyer Quay in early 1921. The Straits Times reported then that that structure was already an "improvement" over the previous, "utterly inadequate" building. The various departments in the block were to relocate gradually before April, which was when work on the new building was initially scheduled to begin. The old General Post Office was vacated on 23 April.

Tenders for the demolition of the General Post Office were released in May. The offices of the Registrar of Imports and Exports were moved into the ground floor of the old Post Office from its previous "inadequate" premises on 1 July, where it remained until April 1922. This was followed by the office of the Staff Officer to Local Forces S.S. and F.M.S. on 15 July and the headquarters of the Singapore branch of the Boy Scouts Association on 1 August. By then, the building's clock had been stuck at 11.30. The Western Australian Trade Delegation organised an exhibit at the building in mid-November. The ground committee for the upcoming Malaya–Borneo Exhibition had moved in around that time, as had the offices of H. Gooding Field, who was in charge of the cost-of-living enquiry for the Municipality. The former remained there until February 1922. The building's quadrangle also served as the venue for a ceremony in which the Imperial Service Medal was awarded by Governor's Deputy P. S. James to the Pulau Brani lascar Saman bin Suloh. The plans for the new post office were then still "under consideration."

Demolition of the old Post Office, as well as the Master Attendant's Office, was underway in May 1922. The ornamental work of the post office was still "in good condition" when the ironwork on the roof was removed, though some interior beams had "gone badly at the ends" and it was opined that the structure had "seen its best days." The Free Press then mistakenly reported the structure as having been completed in 1874, confusing it with its predecessor. This was corrected two months after, and the paper then opined that the "question of the date of construction of so well-known a building as the Post Office once more points to the shortness of the life of memory in Singapore." The last standing walls of the building were pulled down on 16 July. The works revealed the old base of the seven-inch gun of the Singapore Volunteer Artillery's old Drill Hall. After delays caused by the Municipality's lack of funds, work on the new Post Office finally began in early 1924.
