= Dispensary Building =

Building in Singapore

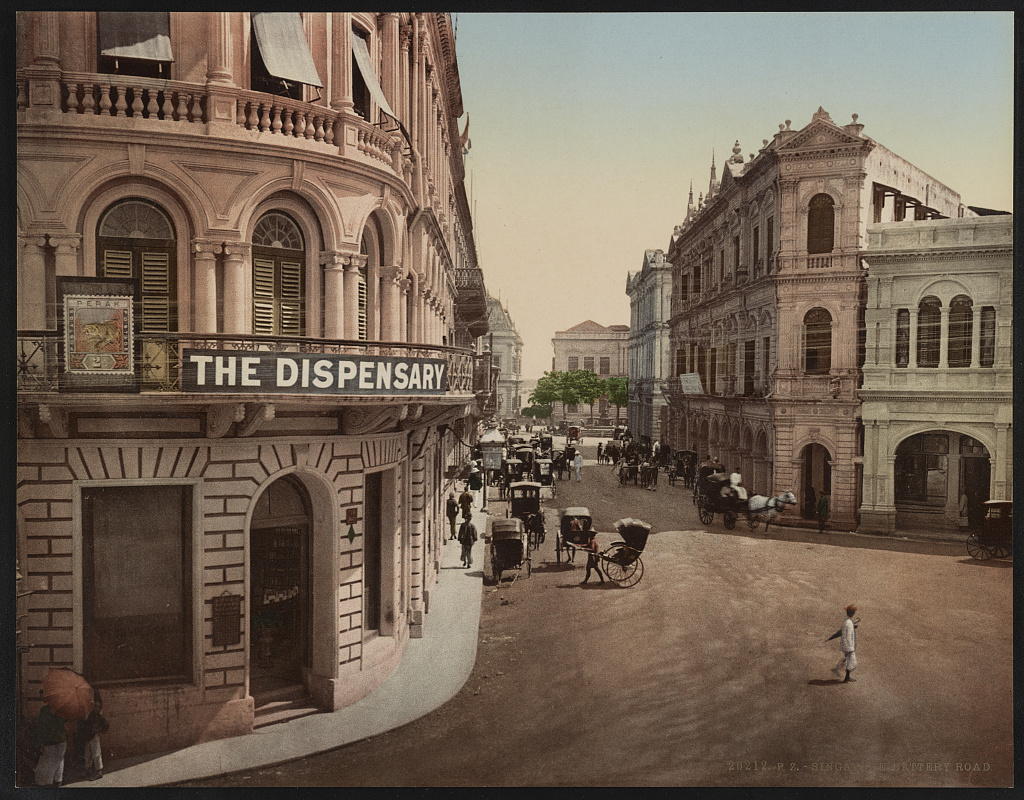
- The Dispensary Building (left) in the 1890s
- Interactive map of the Dispensary Building area

General information
- Architectural style: Palazzo style (primary) Rusticated (basement floor) Romanesque (first floor) Palladian (top floor)
- Coordinates: 1.28545°N 103.85163°E
- Opening: Early 1890s
- Client: Trustees of Seah Eu Chin's estate

Design and construction
- Architecture firm: Swan & Lermit

The Dispensary Building, also known as The Dispensary or the New Dispensary Building, was a prominent landmark at the corner of Bonham Street and Battery Road in Singapore. Erected in the early 1890s to replace an earlier Dispensary Building, it housed a prominent dispensary, a number of clinics founded by noted local physicians, as well as the Marine Club and several shops and offices. It was replaced by the Chartered Bank Chambers in the 1910s.

== Description ==
Situated at the junction of Bonham Street and Battery Road, the three-store structure, which included the Dispensary in the centre. It was located on a triangular plot of land with an area "nearer sixteen thousand feet than fifteen thousand" and designed primarily in the palazzo style, which was "commonly used for lagre commercial and civic buildings in the nineteenth century." Despite this, it featured a "rusticated" basement, a first floor designed in the Romanesque style, and the Palladian style applied to the top floor, "not that anyone minded" this inconsistency. It featured four "enormous" plate glass windows which were reportedly the largest of their kind in the region, as well as a pitch, which, together with the windows, "[afforded] an abundance of air and light".

Each floor was spacious, which was "to the utmost advantage" of the dispensary and its "extensive array of medical preparations", with tessellated flooring. The ground floor housed the dispensary and some offices which opened onto Battery Road, while the first floor housed the dispensary's consulting and bookkeeping rooms. Both floors had several retail units. The top floor had several "large, airy and well-lit" rooms. This space was occupied by the Marine Club on the building's completion, which installed two billiard tables, a bar, and fitted one room as a reading and meeting room. There was a verandah along Bonham Street.

== History ==
In 1890, architects Swan & Lermit were commissioned by the trustees of merchant Seah Eu Chin's estate to rebuild the Dispensary Building at 10-12 Battery Road. This was part of a larger scheme in which Battery Road was to be widened and the structures along it relocated and rebuilt. The structures which were to be demolished included the previous Dispensary Building, the premises of the Dispensary founded by Dr. John Hutchinson Robertson in 1870, and which housed several clinics operated by "top doctors" as tenants. The dispensary was initially to move to the plot just across the road from its predecessor, though it was later decided that it would occupy the ground floor of the new building on the same site, then owned by Seah Liang Seah. The building was the work of Alfred William Lermit, who "made a much better job" of the project than his colleague Archibald Alexander Swan did on the Paterson, Simons & Co. godowns at Clarke Quay. As work on the block began, rooms on the top floor of the building were leased to the Marine Club, which was in the midst expanding, having recently opened up to all citizens instead of being exclusive to mariners, and felt that the top floor of the building would be "adaptable to their wants."

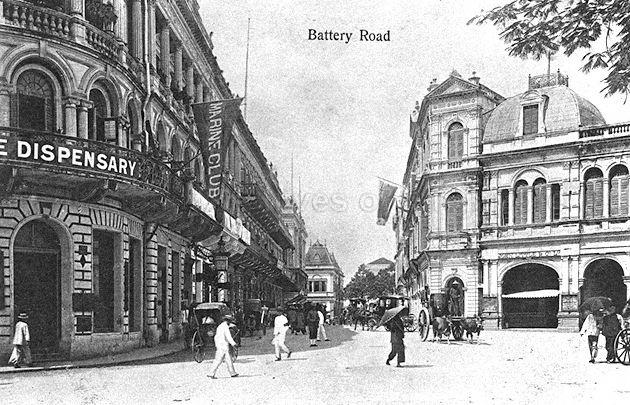
Battery Road with the Dispensary Building (left) in the 1900s.

The building was well-received, considered a "welcome addition to the Battery Road end of Raffles Place." Though construction was still far from completion in September 1891, The Singapore Free Press opined then that "enough [could] be seen to indicate that in all respects the new building in Battery Road [would] be a credit to the town", and that it was likely "many times more valuable" than the structure it replaced. By then, the Marine Club had already opened on the top floor and the ground floor offices had been occupied by the Aerated Water Office. The upper floors were to house a dentist's clinic, the practice of Dr. E. de Vos and the "modest" offices of the Singapore branch of Mitsui Bussan Kaisha, the first Japanese trading company in Singapore Some time after its completion, The Straits Times remarked that the "striking" building was "probably the most handsome and most complete establishment of its kind." The dispensary was described as "the most luxurious place of its kind in the Straits." A landmark, the Dispensary Building was frequently depicted in photographs from the era. In 1904, local architect Wan Mohammed Kassim was commissioned by Drs. Thomas Murray Robertson and Lim Boon Keng to design a servants' quarters on the premises.

In July 1913, it was announced that the Chartered Bank of India, Australia and China had acquired the property from two of Seah Eu Chin's grandsons, Seah Eng Kun and Seah Eng Kiat, on a 999-year lease. The negotiations for the deal were reportedly "so quietly carried out" that only around half a dozen people knew of the deal before its completion. The bank's local branch had grown to such an extent that they would have to renovate and expand the ground space of its former premises at the junction of Flint Street and Battery Road and evict several of their tenants, including a pharmacy and the offices of Swan & Lermit successor Swan & Maclaren, if they wished to remain there. As such, the bank decided to relocate, acquiring the Dispensary Building with the help of Swan & Maclaren. The news of this acquisition likely came as a "shock" to the building's tenants, which then included Garner, Quelch & Co., Dallman & Co., the Anglo Swiss Watch Co., Motion & Co. and the local Association of Engineers, in addition to the dispensary itself, who were all given six months to vacate the premises before the building was to be torn down. Demolition had been "going on for some time past" by mid-January, caused by poor supervision of the labourers which resulted in a collapse, leaving at least three labourers seriously injured. The building had been pulled down completely a month after. The Chartered Bank Chambers opened in May 1916.
