= Transfer of the Straits Settlements =

Establishment of Penang, Singapore and Malacca as a Crown Colony

The Transfer of the Straits Settlements was the official handover of the Straits Settlements, then made up of the colonies of Penang, Singapore and Malacca, from the British India Office to the British Colonial Office on 1 April 1867. This transfer was initiated with the passing of the Straits Settlements Act 1866 (29 & 30 Vict. c. 115), thus assigning the Straits Settlements crown colony status.

The demand for transfer was primarily driven by the European mercantile community in the Settlements who were dissatisfied with the existing administration. Key issues contributing to this discontent were over governance, representation, financial policies, and the use of the Settlements as a penal colony. The transfer would have lasting impacts, establishing the new administration of the Straits Settlements and paving the way for the British colonisation of Malaya.

== Background ==
=== Governance of the Straits Settlements ===
In 1826, the British East India Company united the colonies of Penang, Malacca, and Singapore to form the Straits Settlements. This action was an attempt by the EIC to reduce expenses by making the existing presidency of Penang financially self-sufficient. Despite this, in 1830, financial woes let the EIC to remove the Settlements' presidency status, reestablishing it as a residency under the control of the Bengal Presidency, headquartered in Calcutta. In 1851, the Straits Settlements were converted to a direct dependency and supervision was given to the Governor General of India. After the EIC was dissolved in 1858, control was finally handed over to the India Office.

The government structure put in place during the Settlements' demotion to residency would remain the same till the 1867 transfer. This government had a reduced staff, compromising only eight personnel as compared to the nineteen during its time as a presidency. The settlements' chief administrator held the title of governor, however, he lacked real authority due to his relatively low rank within the EIC's civil service. The authority of the governor and his administration was further reduced by the Government of India Act 1833 (3 & 4 Will. 4. c. 85). This act not only abolished the EIC's monopoly on trade with China but also consolidated legislative and administrative powers within the government of Bengal. Consequently, all significant matters and policy decisions had to be relayed to Calcutta for resolution.

As the EIC'S primary interest in the Straits Settlements was to defend and enhance their monopoly on trade with China, the enactment of this act effectively nullified this interest. This shift, along with the absence of representation for the Straits administration in the Bengal government and the significant geographical distance between the Settlements and Calcutta, meant that the Straits administration struggled to communicate and collaborate effectively with the government. As a result, their ability to govern the settlements was severely limited. These challenges would lay the groundwork for further issues, fuelling frustrations within the European mercantile community.

=== Merchant community in the Straits Settlements ===
Since the establishment of Penang, the British merchants that settled in the Straits Settlements generated their income from areas such as shipping, banking, plantation investment, and the trade of Malay and Chinese goods. Prior to Penang's loss of presidency, the merchants saw themselves as separate groups, to the extent that merchant communities in different settlements had rivalries with each other. However, once the Settlements were reduced to a residency, a commercial consciousness began to develop, leading to a collective identity that included other European businessmen in the Straits. It was within this European merchant community that early movements for transfer emerged. United in opposition to unpopular policies set by the Calcutta government, they would also rally their allies in London, advocating for policy changes and ultimately seeking a shift in administration.

== Motivating factors ==
=== Tax and monetary policy ===
Following the establishment of the settlements, a series of unpopular taxes and monetary policies generated considerable dissent within the merchant community. These directives, initiated by the Calcutta government, were often formulated with India in mind, lacking consideration for local issues. The merchant community perceived these policies as detrimental to their commercial interests, prompting them to take action against their implementation. They often resorted to petitions and sending group delegations to the British parliament for negotiations. The success of these efforts varied, sometimes they were successful, while other times they were not.

The most prominent instance was in 1854 when the EIC proposed a new copper currency based on fractions of the Indian rupee as legal tender. However, Spanish and Mexican dollars had been used for trade in Southeast Asia long before British settlement. The merchants feared that this new currency would not be accepted by Malay and Chinese traders, and thus believed that the change would negatively impact their profits. In response, the merchants enlisted John Crawfurd, a former Resident of Singapore, to lead their petition in London. Crawfurd, who had previously led several delegations on behalf of the merchants, encountered strong resistance, resulting in protracted negotiations. Despite their efforts, the currency bill still passed. However, widespread discontent with this policy and strong pressure from the Settlements ultimately led to the petition that resulted in the transfer with Crawfurd spearheading the movement in London.

=== Indian convicts ===
Another of the EIC's initiatives that fuelled merchant dissatisfaction was the use of the Settlements as penal colonies and the fear of Indian convicts. From the establishment of the Settlements till its transfer, the EIC would continuously ship Indian convicts from India to the Settlements to serve their sentences. The Indian convicts eventually became a crucial part of development of the Straits Settlements by serving as source of cheap labour.

Initially, the merchant community had no fear of the convicts; their only resentment came from the cost associated with keeping the convicts under guard. While there were instances of violence from the convicts, fears only rose when the Indian Mutiny began in May of 1857. Concern over the rising number of convicts, including some mutineers being transferred to the Settlements, fuelled fears of potential violence and thus influence the merchants to back the transfer petition.

=== Judiciary and administration of laws ===
The dissatisfaction of the merchant community with the EIC also stemmed from frustrations regarding an ineffective judiciary and the weak administration of laws. The laws in question were based on English law and enacted in Calcutta; however, they were perceived as unsuitable for the Straits Settlements, as they did not account for local customs and circumstances. Furthermore, the lack of funding and support from the EIC resulted in a small ineffective police force and a broken prison system, leaving the Straits administration unable to effectively enforce laws or protect residents.

A significant factor contributing to the movement for transfer was the administration's ineffective control over the Chinese secret societies. The weak police forces were unable to control these large societies, notorious for causing riots and violence. Despite ongoing appeals for the improvement of the police force, little significant action was taken the EIC. This ineffectiveness became a major complaint of merchants' petition for transfer, expressing concerns about threats to property and safety.

== Transfer of the Straits Settlements ==
In August 1855, the idea of transferring the Straits Settlements to the Colonial Office was raised for the first time at a public meeting of merchant firms in Singapore. This meeting was convened over issues of currency, convicts, and the EIC's disinterest in Singapore. While the motion was ultimately rejected by the attendees, this idea of transfer started gaining traction.

In September 1857, in response to further unpopular financial policies, a surge of violence involving convicts and Chinese secret societies, and the outbreak of the Indian Mutiny, a public meeting of the European merchant community was convened. The purpose of this meeting was to consider whether they would support the petition of Culcatta's residents to end the EIC and transfer India directly to Crown rule. The consensus was unanimous, they resolved to support the petition and also to petition for the Settlements to be governed by the Crown.

By mid-October 1857, the petition was signed by most of Singapore's European community. Addressed to the British parliament, the petition highlighted the community's disappointment with the limited change brought by the Settlement's 1851 transition to a direct dependency of Indian government. It also claimed that despite distinct circumstances, the Settlements were governed as if it was in continental India, and had their concerns consistently overlooked. They also argued that they were failed to be provided with adequate representation and judicial support. They highlighted grievances regarding damaging trade measures, ineffective policies toward the Chinese secret societies, and the use of Singapore as a convict station, ultimately requesting to be made a separate dependency of the Crown.

In April 1858, the parliamentary debate on the petition began in the House of Commons. The discussion that followed was short, as the government was more focused on the issues of India. By February 1860, following the EIC's abolishment and control of the Settlements passing to the India Office, parliament agreed to the transfer of the Settlements to the Crown. Yet the transfer was not immediate, and what would follow would be a seven-year long negotiation process between state departments over issues related to the Settlements' defence and debts. Finally, the Government of the Straits Settlements Act was passed on 10 August 1866, and on 1 April 1867, the Straits Settlements are formally handed over to the Crown.

== Aftermath ==
The handover of the Settlements was met with celebration and fireworks in Singapore. The island's town declared a holiday, and the European and Asian communities gathered for the formal inauguration of the colony at the Singapore Town Hall. As the Settlements were now a Crown Colony, they were given a Crown Colony constitution. A new administration was established which would largely remain the same till the Japanese occupation in 1942, featuring an executive council and a legislative council, both led by a governor.

However, the new governor, Sir Harry Ord, would find himself in contention with the European community that had expected more influence than the Crown Colony constitution provided. He would also face issues over administration, taxes, and official relationships with the Malay states, Siam, and the Dutch.

The Transfer would have wide reaching effects for the whole of Malaya. Prior to the transfer, the EIC had adopted a non-intervention stance and neglected the cultivation of positive relationships with local rulers. Influenced by East India Company Act 1784 (24 Geo. 3. Sess. 2. c. 25), the EIC refrained from interfering with local politics, objecting to anything that could add to their responsibilities in Malaya, such as territorial expansion and wars, allowing them to minimise spending. However, following the transfer, adherence to this policy was repealed. The British would increase their interventions in local politics to secure their rule eventually leading to the colonisation of the whole of Malaya.

== Further readings ==
- Abraham, Andrew. "The Transfer of the Straits Settlements: A Revisionist Approach to the Study of Colonial Law and Administration." Journal of the Hong Kong Branch of the Royal Asiatic Society 42 (2002): 1–33.
- Blagden, C O. "British Malaya, 1824–1867. B." Journal of the Malayan Branch of the Royal Asiatic Society 3, no. 2 (November 1925): 1–339.
- Chiang, Hai Ding. "The Origins of the Malaysian Currency System (1867—1906)." Journal of the Malaysian Branch of the Royal Asiatic Society 39, no. 1 (1966): 1–18.
- Emerson, Rupert. Malaysia : A Study in Direct and Indirect Rule. The Macmillan Company, 1979.
- Hall, D.G.E. Historians of South East Asia. London: Macmillan, 1955.
- Lee, Edwin. The British as Rulers : Governing Multiracial Singapore, 1867–1914. Singapore: Singapore University Press, 1991.
- Legge, John. "The Colonial Office and Governor Ord." Journal of Southeast Asian Studies 29, no. 1 (March 1998): 1–7.
- Mills, L.A., and C.O. Blagden. "British Malaya 1824–1867." Journal of the Malayan Branch of the Royal Asiatic Society 3, no. 2 (November 1925): 1–339.
- Turnbull, Mary. "Convicts in the Straits Settlements 1826–1867." Journal of the Malaysian Branch of the Royal Asiatic Society 43, no. 1 (1970): 87–103.
- Turnbull, Mary. "Internal Security in the Straits Settlements, 1826–1867." Journal of Southeast Asian Studies 1, no. 1 (March 1970): 37–53.
- Turnbull, Mary. The Straits Settlements, 1826–67. London: Athlone Press, 1972.
- Webster, Anthony. "The Development of British Commercial and Political Networks in the Straits Settlements 1800 to 1868: The Rise of a Colonial and Regional Economic Identity?" Modern Asian Studies 45, no. 4 (July 2011): 899–929.
