= Cavenagh Bridge =

Bridge in Downtown Core, Singapore

Cavenagh Bridge Jambatan Cavenagh 加文纳桥 கேவனாக் பாலம்
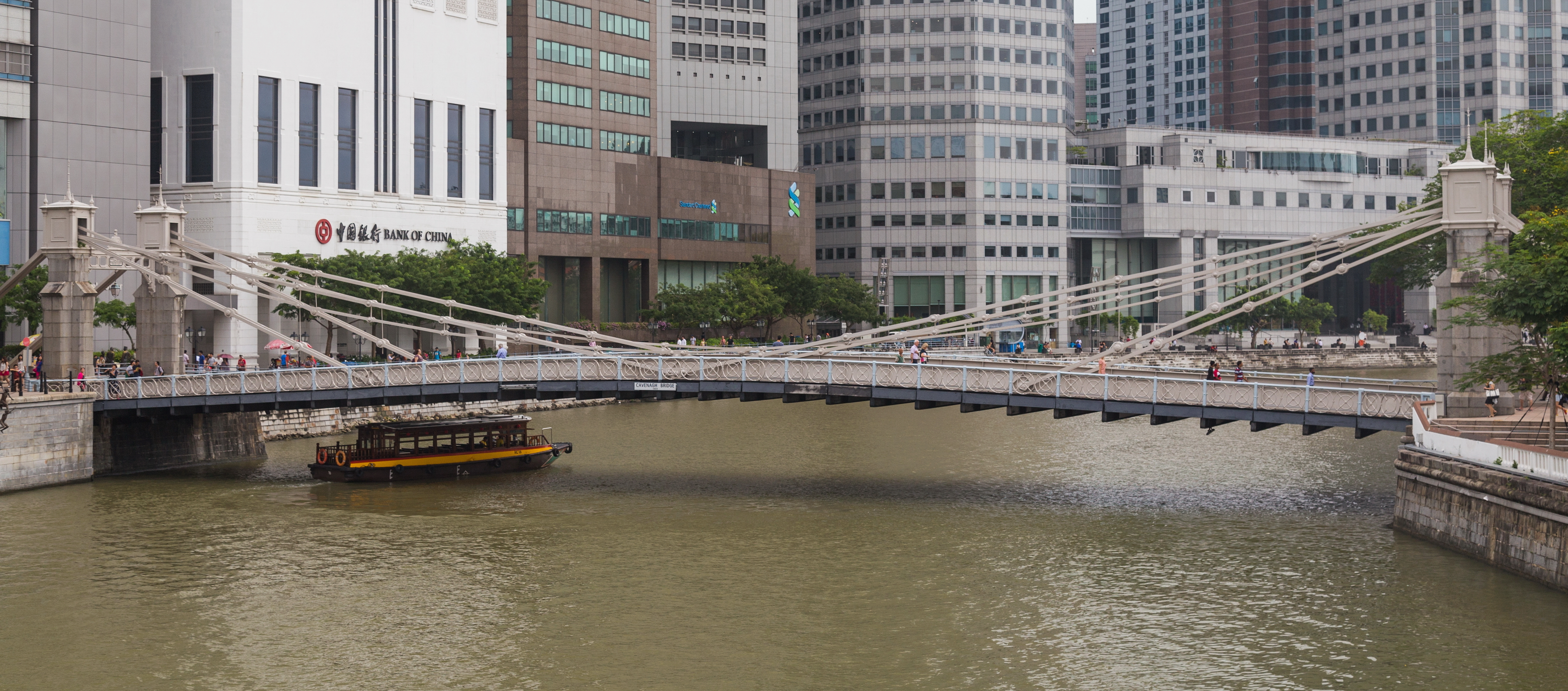
- Cavenagh Bridge in 2016
- Coordinates: 1.28656°N 103.85235°E
- Carries: Pedestrians and bicycles (motor vehicles in the past)
- Crosses: Singapore River
- Locale: Downtown Core, Singapore
- Official name: Cavenagh Bridge

Characteristics
- Design: Cable-stayed bridge
- Total length: 79.25 metres
- Width: 9.45 metres
- Longest span: 60.96 metres

History
- Designer: George Chancellor Collyer; Rowland Mason Ordish; A. H. De Wind
- Constructed by: P. & W. MacLellan
- Construction cost: $80,000–90,000
- Opened: November 1869; 156 years ago

Statistics

National monument of Singapore
- Designated: 15 October 2019; 6 years ago
- Reference no.: 73

Location
- Interactive map of Cavenagh Bridge

Cavenagh Bridge is a pedestrian bridge that spans across the Singapore River. Located near the river's mouth in the Downtown Core Planning Area of Singapore's Central Area, it is the oldest bridge in Singapore that exists in its original form. Opened in November 1869 to commemorate Singapore's Crown colony of the Straits Settlements status in 1867, the bridge's steel structure was created in and imported from Glasgow, Scotland. It was designed by chief engineer George Chancellor Collyer and consulting engineer Rowland Mason Ordish.

Named after former governor Sir Orfeur Cavenagh, upon its opening the bridge was too low for larger boats to pass under during high tide. Its location and cost were criticised, as it was a longer route from the government offices and godowns as compared to the temporary bridge that was in place. By the 20th-century, Cavenagh Bridge carried the bulk of motor traffic and the congestion had worsened to a point where another bridge was needed. In 1910, Anderson Bridge was completed and motor traffic was redirected across it, while Cavenagh Bridge served pedestrian and rikisha traffic. A sign prohibiting motor vehicles and animals from crossing was erected at Cavenagh Bridge, while still stands to this day.

The bridge underwent multiple restorations over the years. In 1972, it was selected for national preservation, and in 2008 for conservation under the Urban Redevelopment Authority's expanded conservation programme. Cavenagh Bridge was later gazetted as a national monument in 2019 alongside Anderson and Elgin Bridge, being collectively gazetted as the Singapore River Bridges.

== History ==
Prior to the creation of Cavenagh Bridge, people crossed the river via ferry, which cost a duit, or by Elgin Bridge, which was built in 1862. Cavenagh Bridge was first proposed in 1867, in commemoration of the creation of the Crown colony of the Straits Settlements that same year; Singapore was a part of the Straits Settlements. The bridge was planned to cross the Singapore River, at its mouth, and would connect Esplanade Park and Fullerton Square.

The governor of the Straits Settlements Sir Harry Ord initially wanted the bridge to be named "Edinburgh Bridge", in honour of Alfred, Duke of Edinburgh's visit to Singapore. However, this did not go through, and instead the Singaporean councillors of the Legislative Council of the Straits Settlements named it "Cavenagh Bridge", after the last East India Company-appointed governor Sir Orfeur Cavenagh. The bridge was designed by chief engineer of the Straits Settlements George Chancellor Collyer and consulting engineer Rowland Mason Ordish.

=== Construction ===
The bridge's structure was made of steel that was imported from Glasgow, Scotland, and made by P. & W. MacLellan. J. Cazalas was one of two tenders who supplied the wood needed in Cavenagh Bridge's construction. During the construction in April 1869, frequent interruptions and risks came from tongkangs hitting the construction site. To prevent this issue, a portion of the river by the site was closed, leaving two gaps around the cofferdam that only boats weighing less than two coyans could pass through.

In May, the bridge's north suspension chains were set up. Some chain links were found to be shorter by half a foot and underwent extension at Cazalas's foundry. The bridge's south turrets were built six feet taller than the level of the girder. In June, the south side's turrets were complete and had their saddles built; the turrets were made of granite. The installation of the iron was moving slowly, as the chain links were still undergoing expansion. By July, the iron structure of the bridge was complete, which included its four anchors. The piles and wedges supporting the main and cross girders were removed, and the river's navigation was restored. The bridge was one of the last projects built with Indian convict labour.

Tenders to lay the bridge's timber flooring were announced in July, and the bridge was expected to finish by mid-September 1869. On 25 September, it was reported that half the carriageway had been laid, the side channels for removing surface water fixed, and the footways's plank flooring completed. In preparation of Cavenagh Bridge's completion, a by-law was submitted that would direct traffic across the bridge. By October the bridge had been completed, but its opening was delayed for the arrival of the Duke of England, who was to officiate its opening. In the meantime, a wooden footbridge – that crossed Bonham Street – substituted foot traffic crossing the river. Cavenagh Bridge cost around $80,000 to $90,000.

=== Opening and subsequent developments ===
Cavenagh Bridge, before c. 1880

Cavenagh Bridge was opened in November 1869 by the Municipal Commission in an "unostentatious" ceremony; the commissioners celebrated by drinking champagne. The Duke of Edinburgh's visit had been delayed and he was unable to officiate the opening. Upon its opening, The Straits Times reported that large cargo boats were unable to pass under during high tide or periods of rain due to a lack of clearance between the river and the bridge. Furthermore, Cavenagh's name was misspelt on his coat of arms, which hung on either side of the bridge. His name was eventually corrected.

In February 1870, work on removing the piles and clay of the cofferdam was still underway, as work could only be done during periods of low tide. In April, there was some public contention over the cost of the bridge and the location. Initially, a temporary bridge crossed the river at Market Street and Bonham Street which served many, but when Cavenagh Bridge was being planned it was decided to be built at Flint Street, shifted from Bonham. Due to this, access to government offices from the godowns became considerably further, with only godowns built nearby Cavenagh benefiting from its position. European and Chinese traders in the Boat Quay, Market Street, Malacca Street, and Telok Ayer areas were forced to take the longer route offered by Cavenagh instead of the original Bonham Street route. Therefore, the commissioners were criticised for not taking in the public's opinion before constructing Cavenagh Bridge.

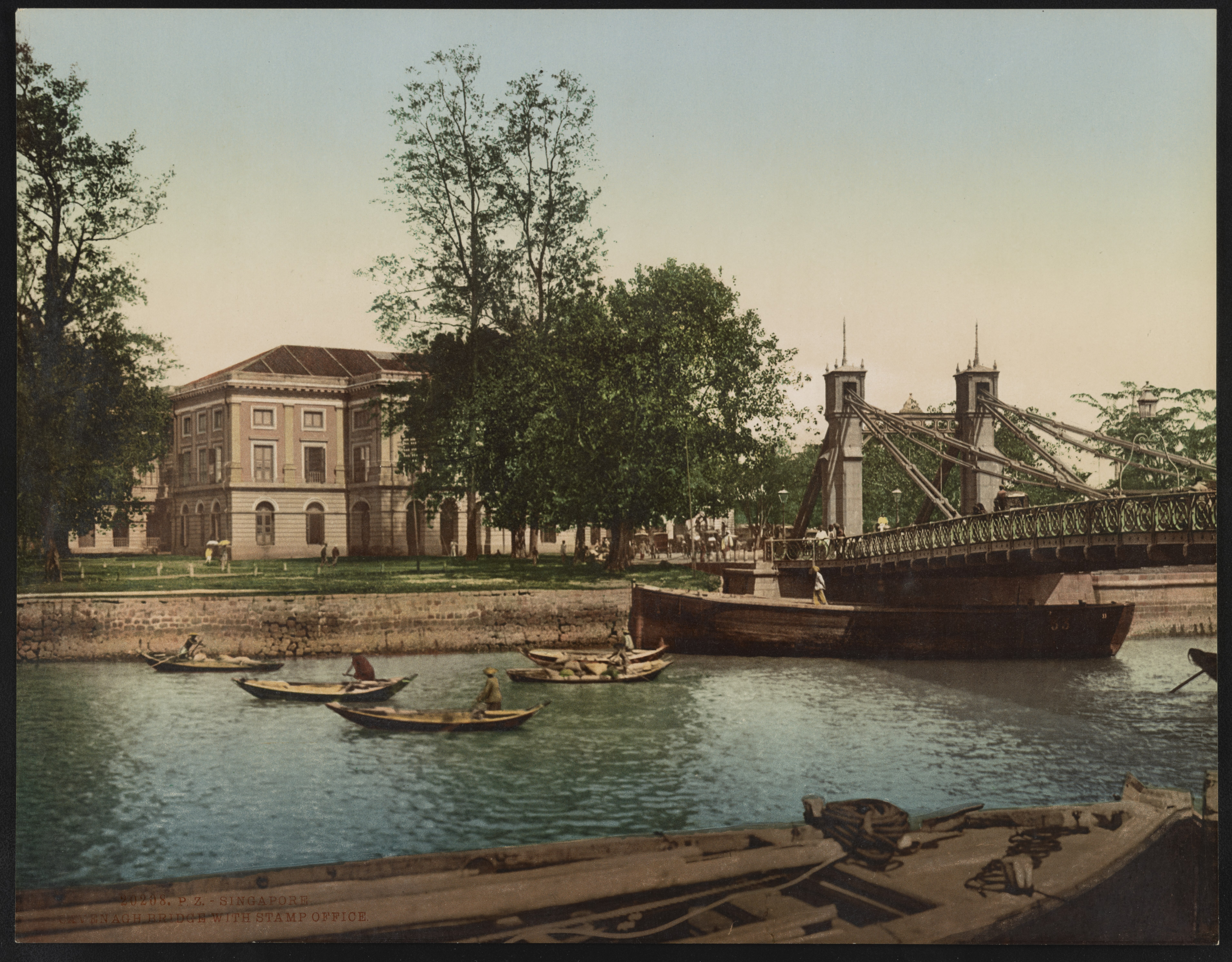
Cavenagh Bridge (right) in 1890

Following the opening of Coleman and Ord Bridge and the widening of Elgin Bridge in 1886, it was suggested that Cavenagh Bridge be demolished and replaced. By the start of the 20th-century, traffic across Cavenagh Bridge had worsened to a point where it was necessary to construct a new bridge to ease the congestion; the widening of Battery Road was a factor in the increasing congestion. In 1901, the Singapore River Commission looked into widening Cavenagh Bridge or creating a new bridge, with the Commission opting for the latter. In 1910, the new bridge – called Anderson Bridge – was completed, with traffic being redirected across it. Cavenagh Bridge then mostly served pedestrian and rikisha traffic. A sign was further placed that prohibited horses, cattle, and vehicles from passing that weighed more than 3 cwt (hundredweight); this sign still stands to this day.

In 1913, motor traffic across Cavenagh Bridge was officially prohibited by the Municipal Commission, however it was later reported that the rule was not being enforced. By 1936, Cavenagh Bridge was in poor condition as its carriageway had deteriorated and showed the rusted iron plates underneath, prompting restoration. Repairs began in October 1936 and cost $15,760.50. The repairs were done by the Singapore Harbour Board and included laying a new concrete decking for the bridge. Its two main girders were also replaced as they had corroded. The bridge's web plates and four towers were also replaced. The repair works were completed sometime in November 1937. In 1972, Cavenagh Bridge was selected for national preservation. The sign standing at the bridge prohibiting vehicles and animals from passing was retained as a "historic relic" in 1976 by the Ministry of National Development.

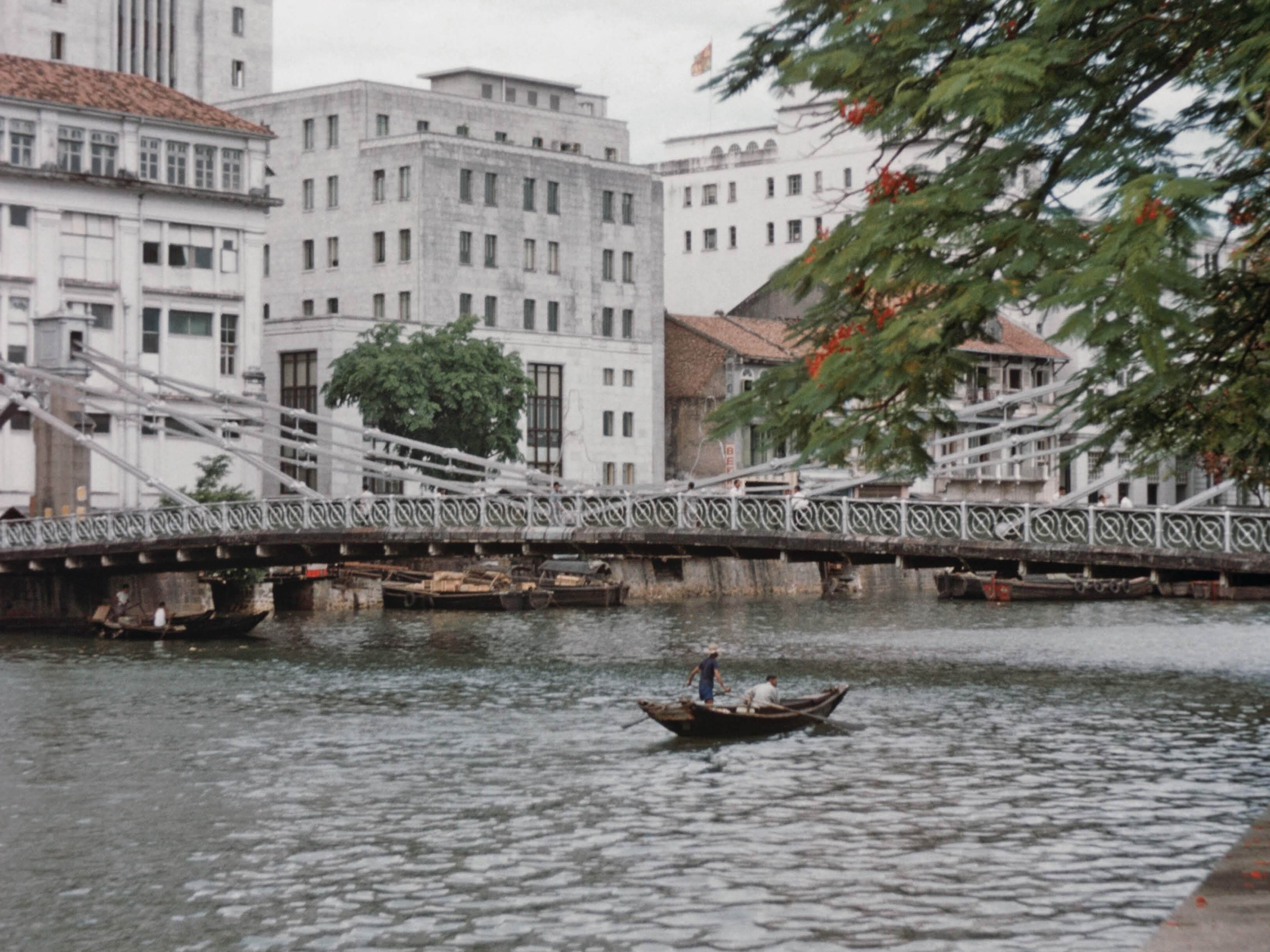
Cavenagh Bridge, 1963

In 1984, during the construction of the Mass Rapid Transit project, Cavenagh Bridge had steel supports in place to protect against tunnelling works under the nearby Empress Place Building. In 1986, minister for national development Teh Cheang Wan announced that Cavenagh Bridge was among eight bridges that would be refurbished. The following year, the bridge underwent S$1.2 million in repair works and was reopened by minister of state for national development Lee Boon Yang. In 1993, lighting was installed on four bridges, including Cavenagh, at a cost of S$1 million by the Singapore Tourist Promotion Board.

In March 2008, the Kyoto Jazz Massive held a live performance on Cavenagh Bridge. Later in November, the bridge was selected for conservation as part of the Urban Redevelopment Authority's expanded conservation programme. In August 2019, deputy prime minister Heng Swee Keat announced that the Padang and the Singapore River Bridges would be made national monuments; the Singapore River Bridges were collectively made up of Cavenagh, Anderson, and Elgin Bridges. On 15 October 2019, the National Heritage Board (NHB) officially gazetted the Singapore River Bridges as the 73rd national monument of Singapore.

== Description ==
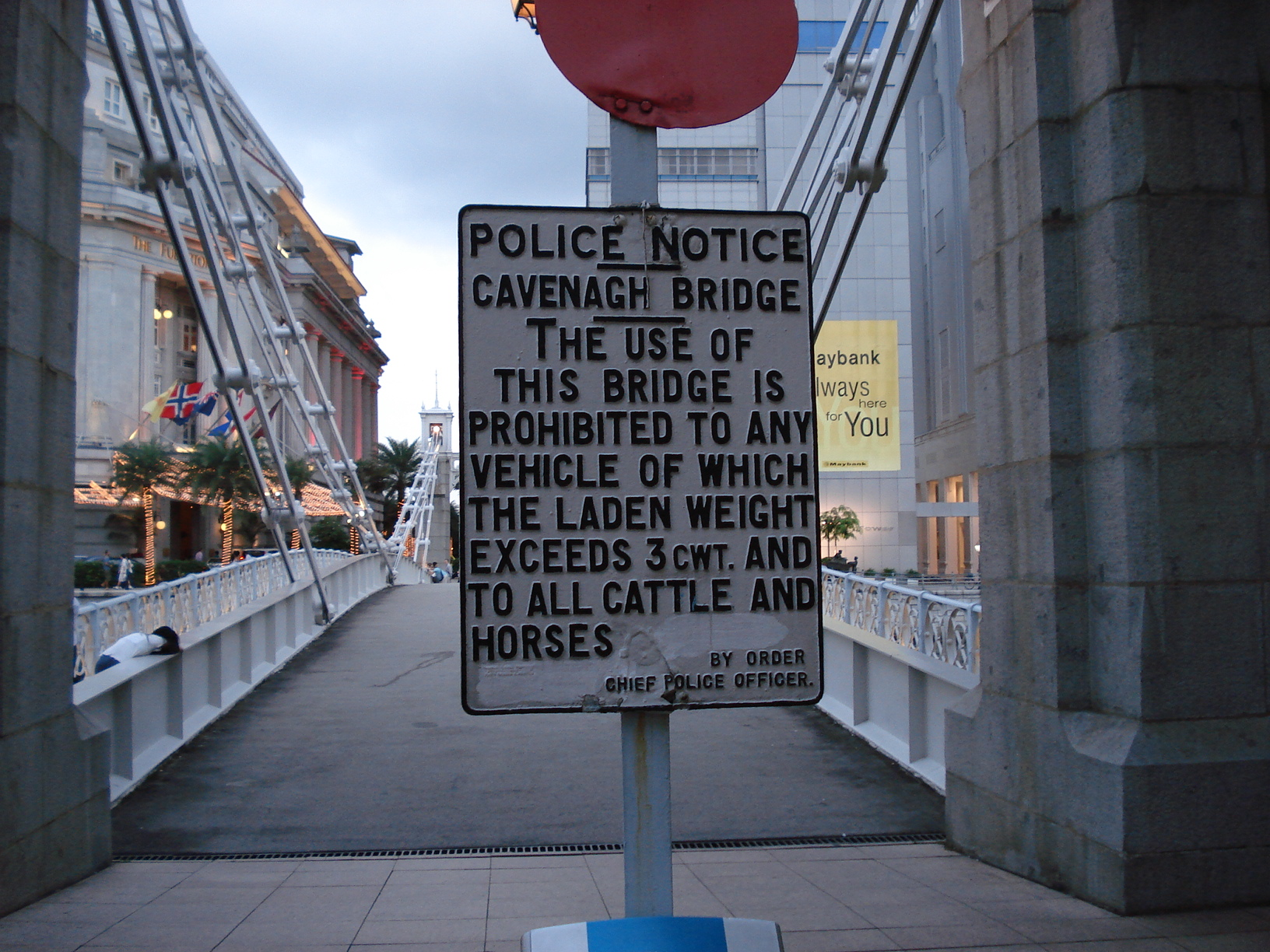
The police notice (pictured in 2007) which presently stands at the bridge

Presently, Cavenagh Bridge serves as a pedestrian bridge. It provides a connection between the city area and Empress Place. The Cavenagh Bridge is the oldest bridge in Singapore in its original form. The bridge is also one of two remaining bridges built in the Ordish–Lefeuvre system, with the other being London's Albert Bridge. The police notice on Cavenagh Bridge was placed there sometime after Anderson Bridge's completion and has stood there ever since. The bridge also features steel plates that include the engineers's names on them, the Cavenagh family's crest, and hanging lamps.

The bridge's total length is 79.25 metres (260.0 ft), with its longest span being 60.96 metres (200.0 ft), while its width is 9.45 metres (31.0 ft). It has two pylons. Following Cavenagh Bridge's gazetting as a national monument, the NHB launched the Milestones Through Monuments programme, where public installation art was erected at the Singapore River Bridges. Cavenagh Bridge's installation art was a set of life-sized origami boats designed by EXD Lab.

Upon its opening in November 1869, The Straits Times described it as "handsome and picturesque", along with "adding variety to the somewhat monotonous banks at the entrance of the river." Betty L. Khoo of New Nation called the bridge "graceful" and compared it favourably with Venice's Bridge of Sighs and London's Waterloo Bridge. Following its gazetting as a national monument, a plaque was added to the bridge which states:

Completed in 1869, Cavenagh Bridge is the oldest and only iron cable-stayed bridge in Singapore. It was named after Sir Orfeur Cavenagh, the last Governor of the Straits Settlements under the government of British India (1859–1867). Manufactured by P & W MacLellan in Glasgow, it was shipped to Singapore for assembly. In 1910, Anderson Bridge was opened to ease the increasing traffic load at Cavenagh Bridge, and the latter was later redesigned as a pedestrian bridge.

== Gallery ==
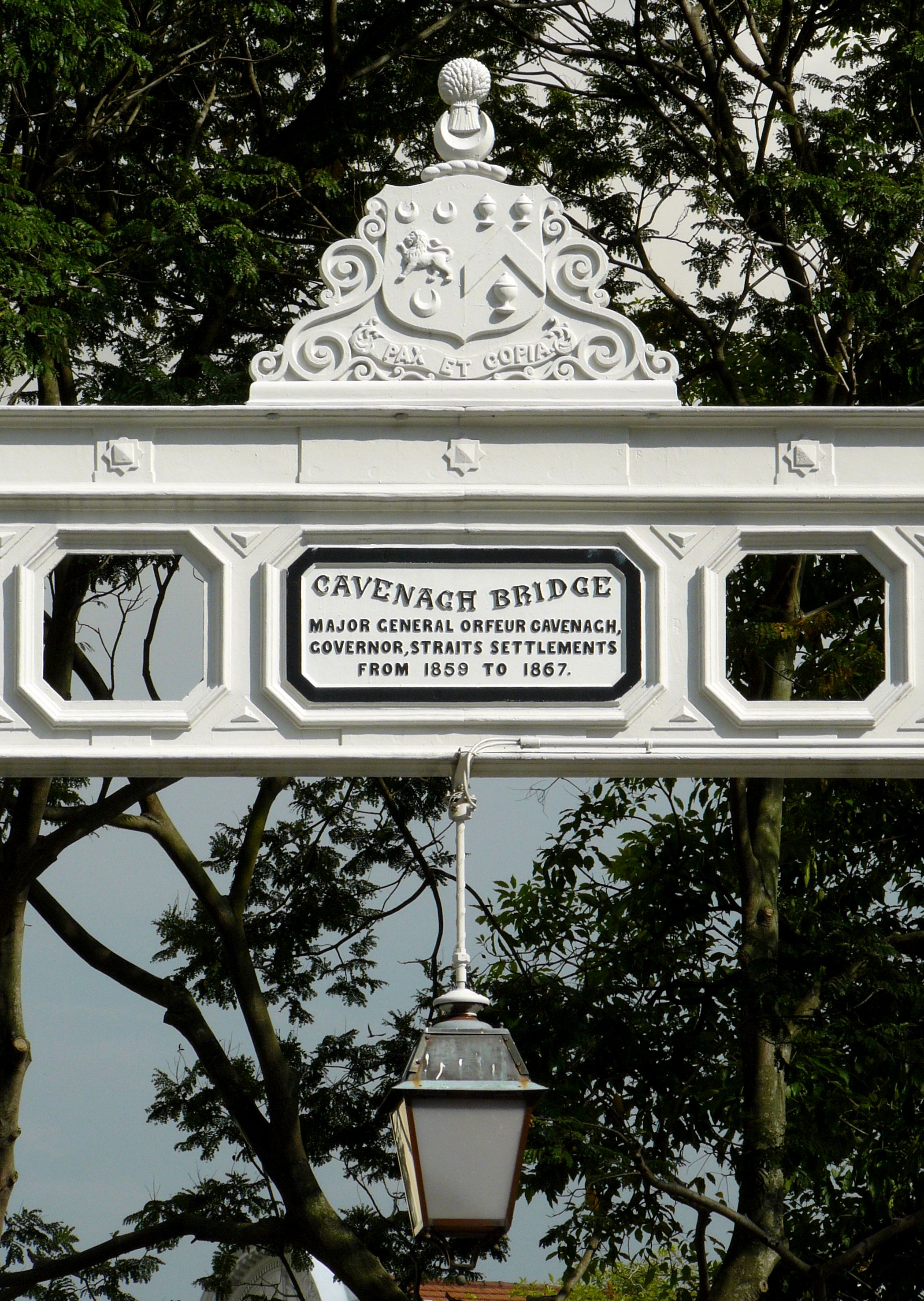
The Cavenagh family crest and a sign with Cavenagh's name on the bridge

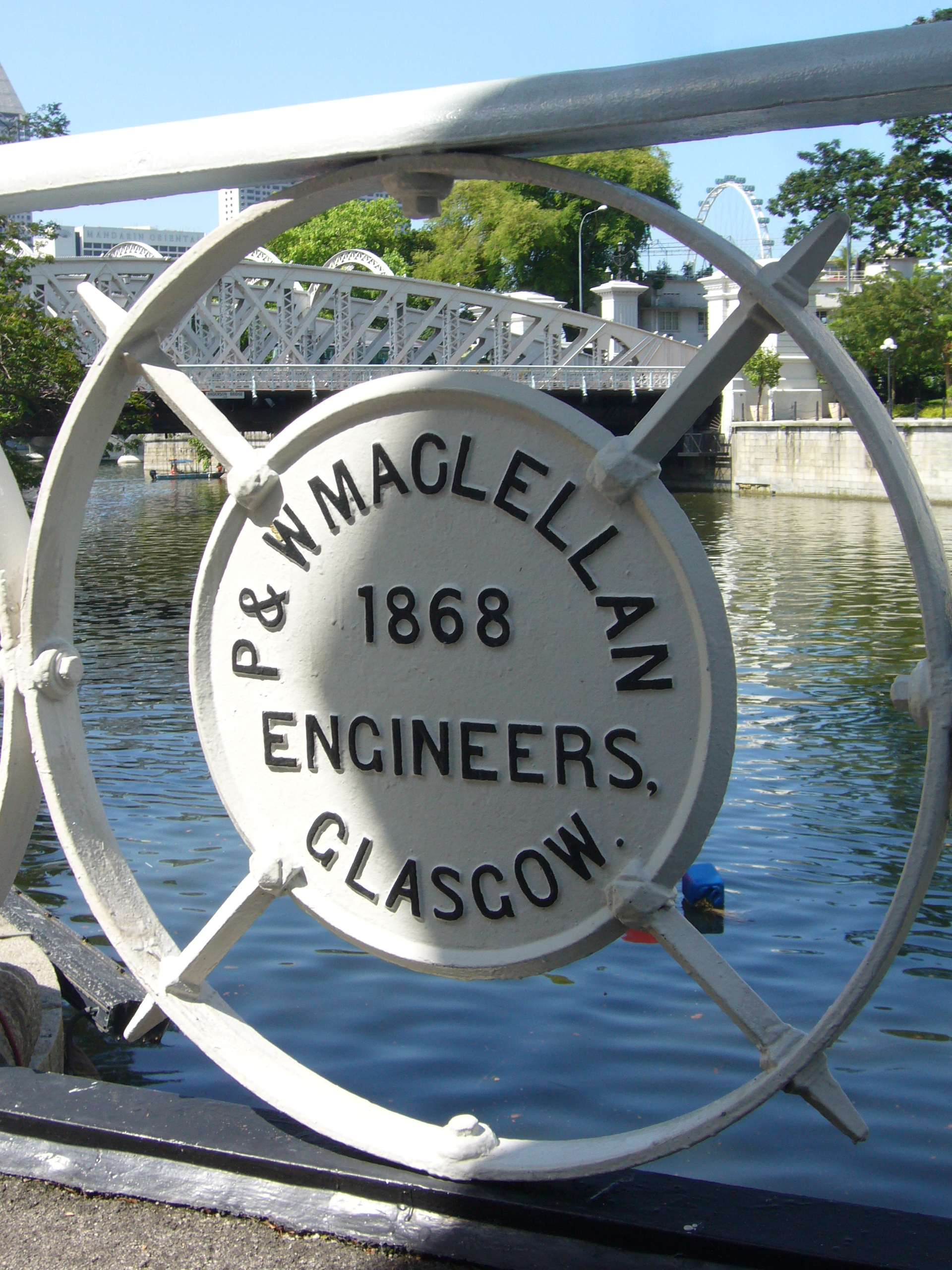
The P. & W. MacLellan plaque on the bridge

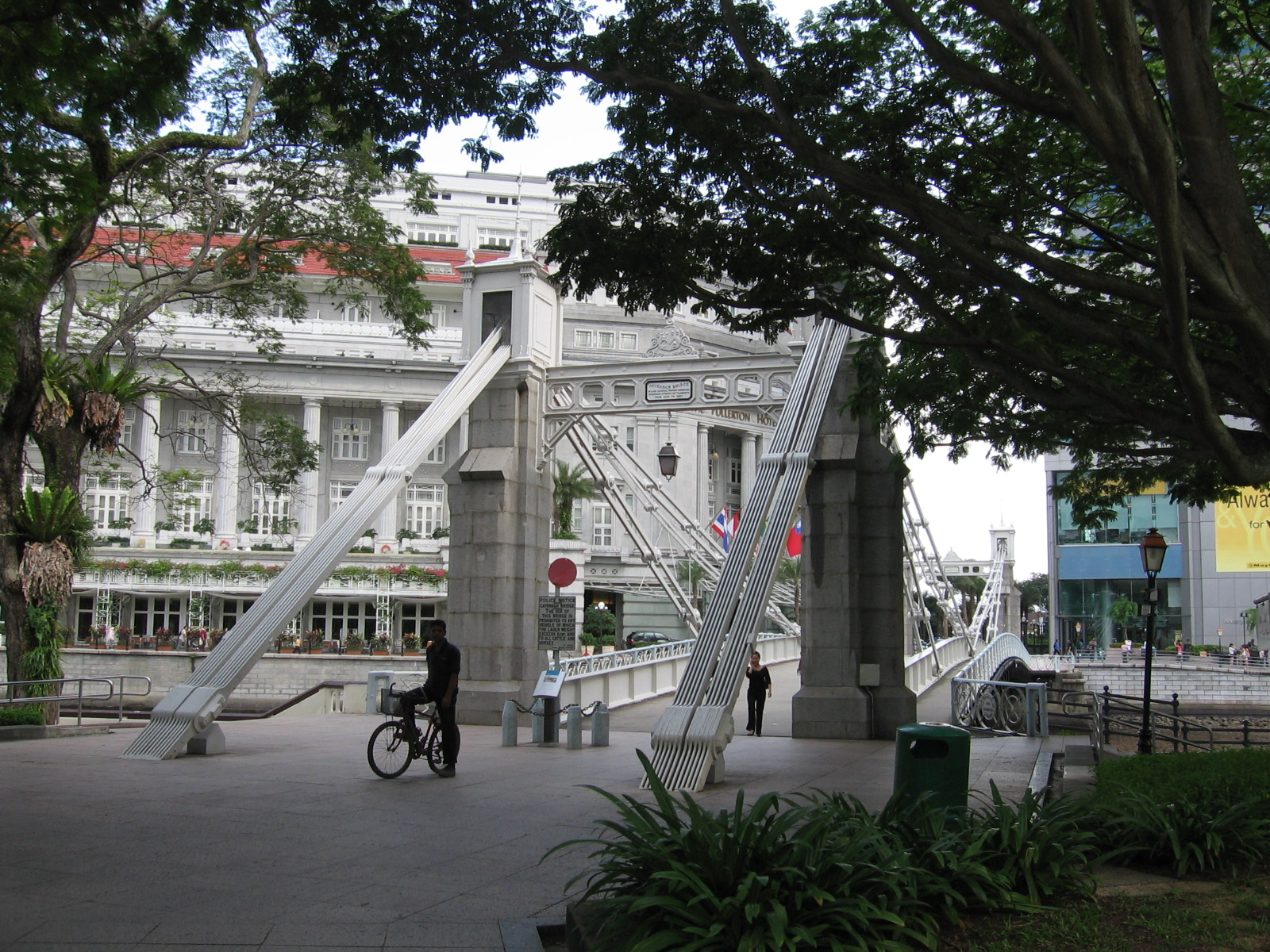
The north entrance of Cavenagh Bridge

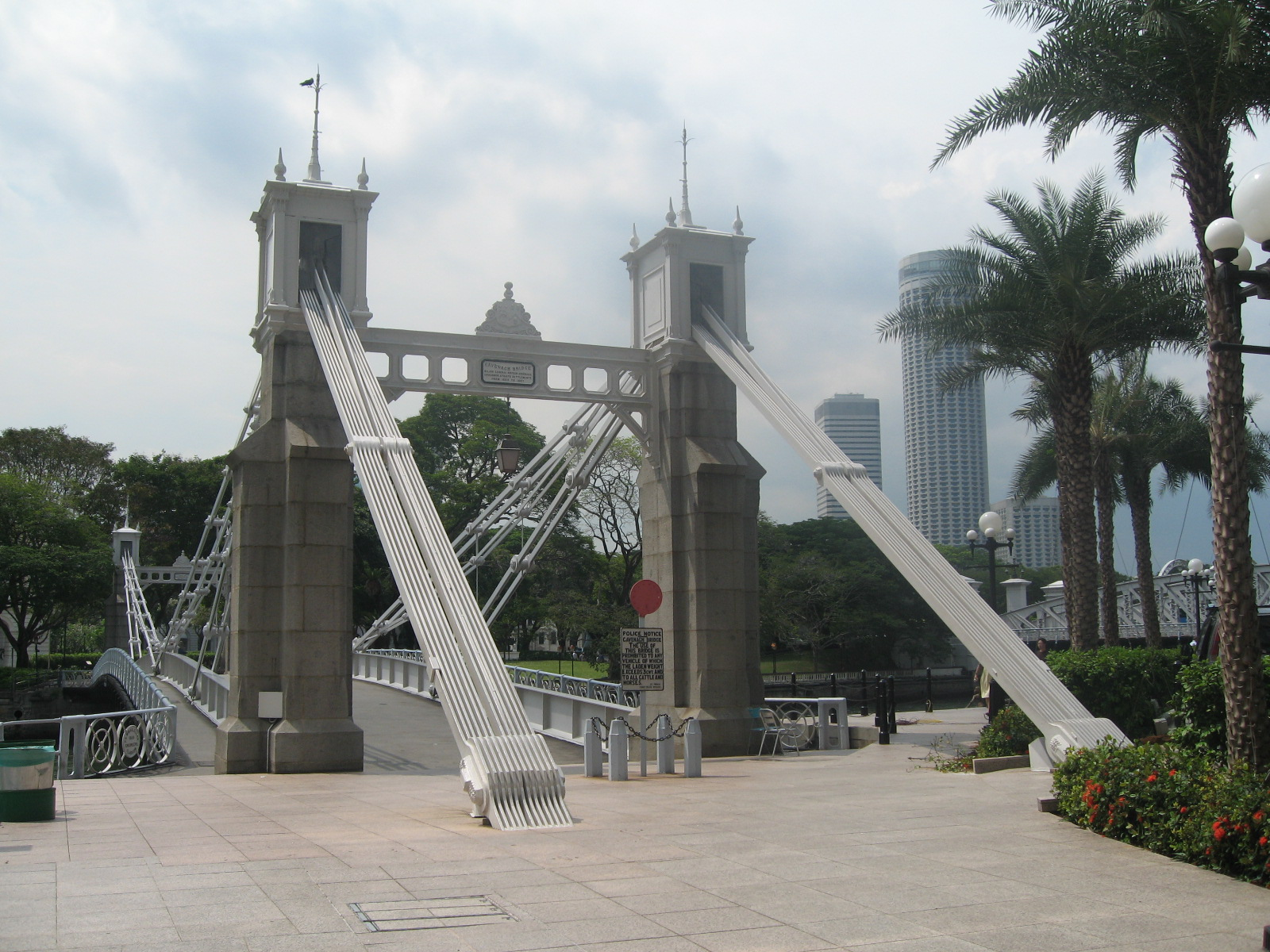
The south entrance of Cavenagh Bridge

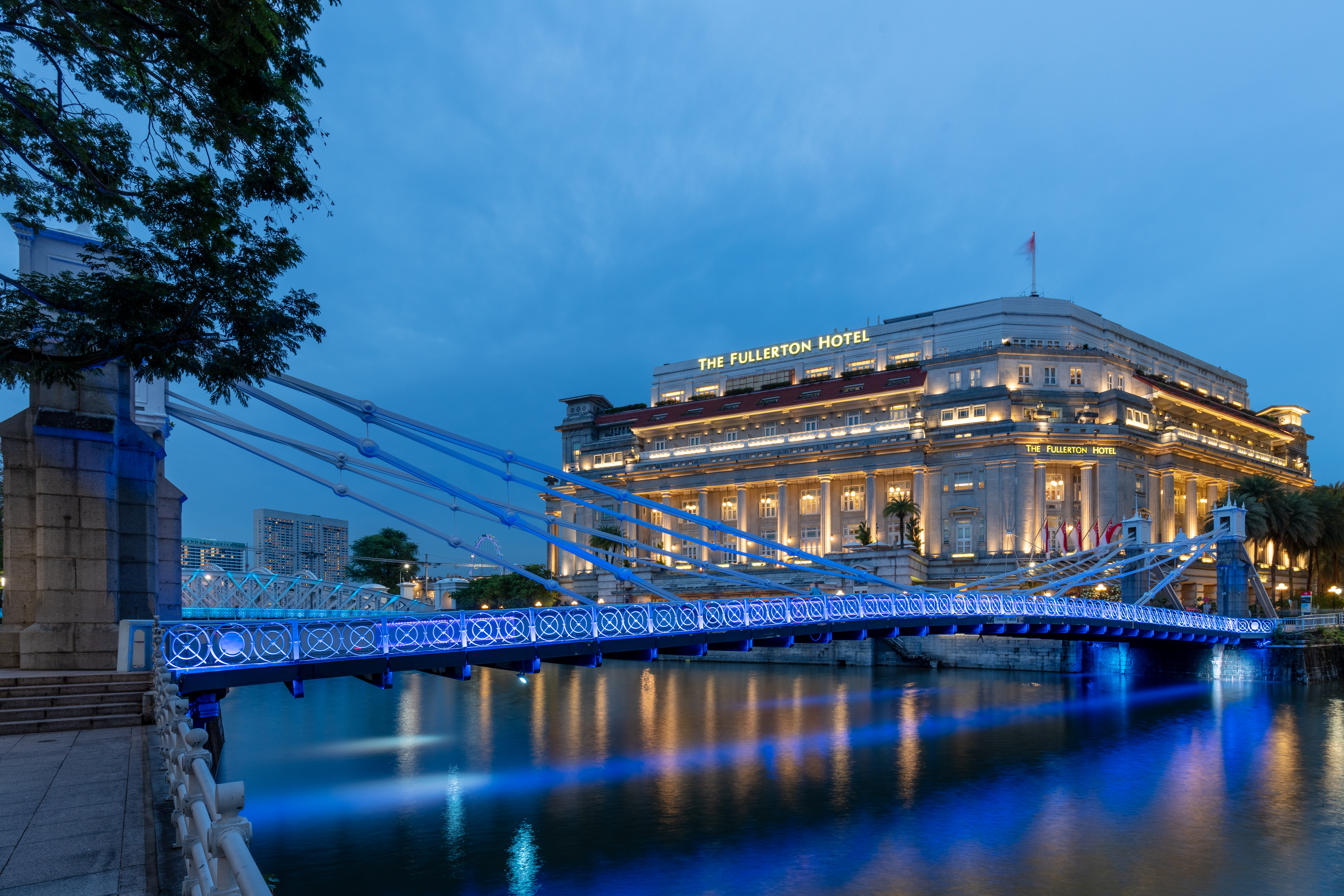
Night view of Cavenagh Bridge, with The Fullerton Hotel in the background

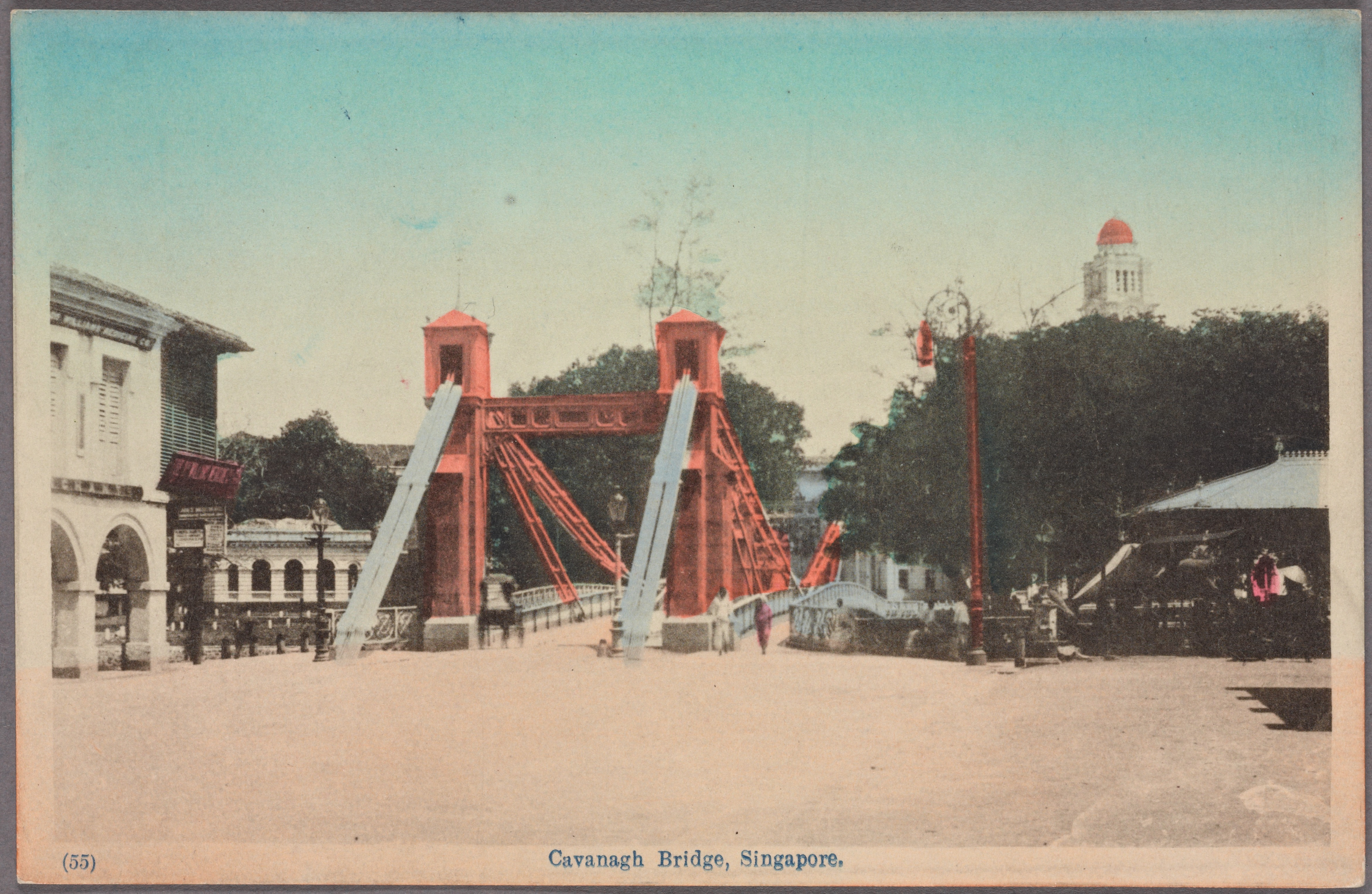
Cavenagh Bridge in 1907

== See also ==
- List of bridges in Singapore
- National monuments of Singapore
