= Swan & Maclaren Group =

- Formerly: Swan & Lermit; Swan & Maclaren
- Company type: Architectural, Interior and Urban Design
- Industry: Commercial, Industrial, Infrastructure, Healthcare, Entertainment, Hospitality
- Founded: 1887; 139 years ago in Singapore (as Swan & Lermit); 1892; 134 years ago (as Swan & Maclaren)
- Founders: Archibald Swan, Alfred Lermit, James Waddel Boyd Maclaren
- Headquarters: 12-03, UE Square, 83 Clemenceau Avenue, Singapore 239920
- Key people: Robert Yap Min Choy, Executive Chairman; Edwin Tan Puay Kiat, CEO; Lim Chai Boon, President; Saw Kok Wei, CFO
- Services: Architecture; Urban Design; Master Planning; Interior Design
- Website: www.swanmaclaren.com

Swan & Maclaren Architects is a Singaporean architectural and industrial design firm. Among the oldest architectural firms in the nation, it was formerly known as Swan & Maclaren and Swan & Lermit. The practice was a leading architectural force during the early 20th century, particularly when Singapore was a crown colony, and played a pivotal role in shaping the built environment of the period. Its portfolio encompasses a wide array of iconic heritage structures found across the former British Malaya.

Currently based at UE Square, the firm continues to play an active role in Singapore's architectural landscape through the design of contemporary developments. In addition to its domestic operations, the firm maintains a regional presence with offices located in several Asian countries, reflecting its continued relevance and international outreach.

== History ==
=== Early history ===
The company began in Singapore, Straits Settlements as Swan & Lermit in 1887, a civil engineering firm formed by two surveyor engineers, Archibald Alexander Swan (1857–1911) and Alfred Lermit. Structures designed by the firm in this period include the Dispensary Building. Lermit later withdrew from partnership in 1890, and joined with Crane Brothers and later with Johannes Bartholomew Westerhout. In 1892, it became Swan & Maclaren after another surveyor engineer, James Waddell Boyd Maclaren, joined as partner. Notable works from Swan in the period between Swan & Lermit and Swan & Maclaren include the Medical Hall, the Fraser & Neave Building and the Straits Insurance Building. Swan was awarded the commission for the Hongkong and Shanghai Bank Building in 1891, though the final drawings for the project were not submitted until after the founding of Swan & Maclaren.

=== Rise to prominence ===
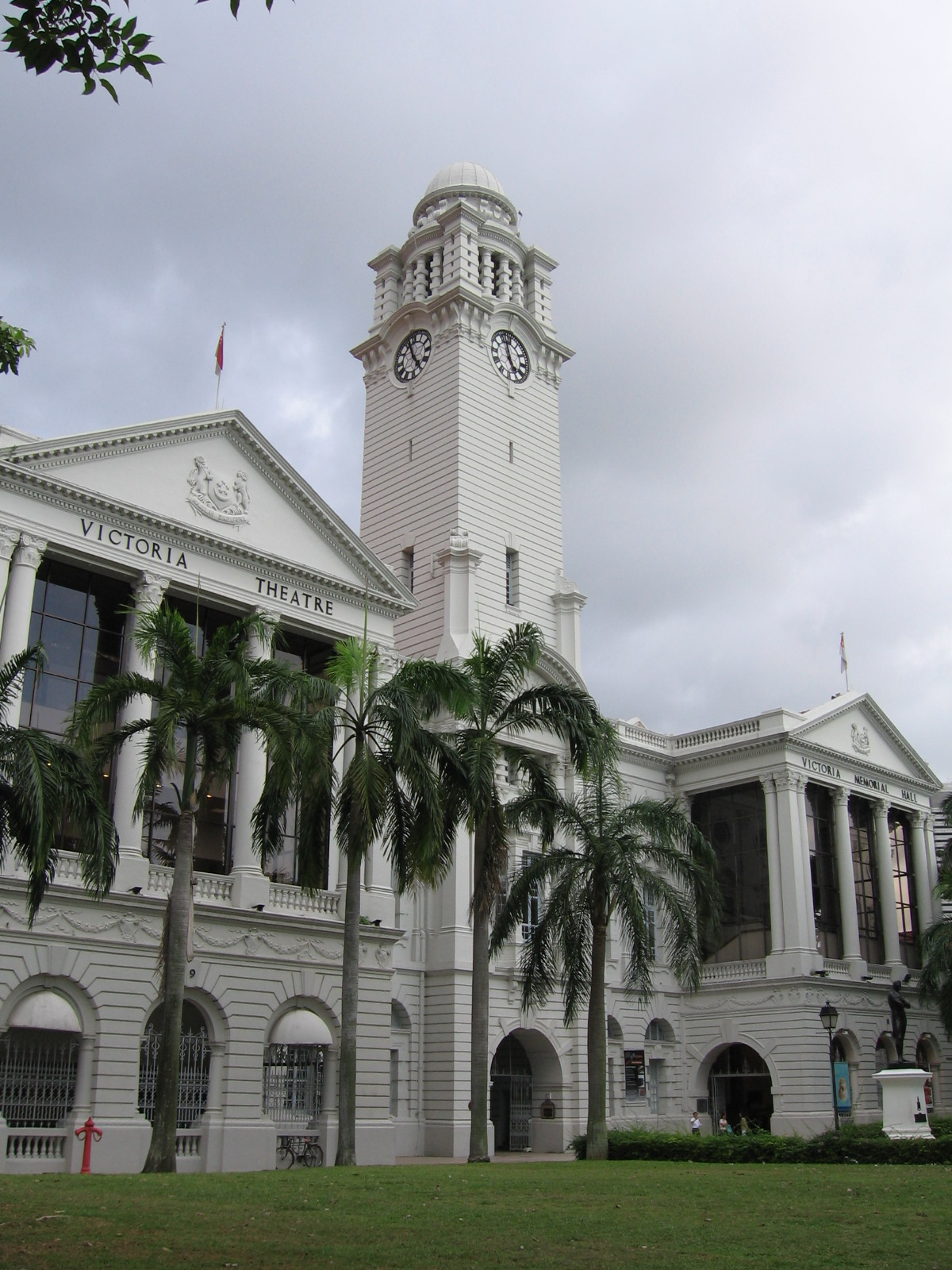
The Victoria Memorial Hall (right) was designed by RAJ Bidwell of Swan and Maclaren, who duplicated the adjacent original Town Hall that subsequently became the Victoria Theatre (left). Bidwell also designed the clock tower joining the two buildings.

In 1897, Regent Alfred John Bidwell joined the firm, arriving in Singapore from England after a short working stint at the Public Works Department in Kuala Lumpur of the Federated Malay States. He was the first professionally trained architect in Singapore since George Drumgoole Coleman had practised in the town in the 1820s and 1830s. Bidwell found an opportunity in Singapore to exercise his knowledge of the full range and variety of Western architectural vocabulary.

Because of Bidwell's talent and reputation for designing handsome government buildings, Swan and Maclaren became the dominant architectural firm in colonial Singapore. Bidwell dominated its work between 1897 and 1911. The firm proceeded to win the most prestigious commissions in Singapore, and many of its early buildings are still extant today. Some of these buildings have been gazetted as national monuments, and these include Raffles Hotel (1899), Teutonia Club (1900, now Goodwood Park Hotel) and Victoria Memorial Hall (1905, now Victoria Theatre and Concert Hall).

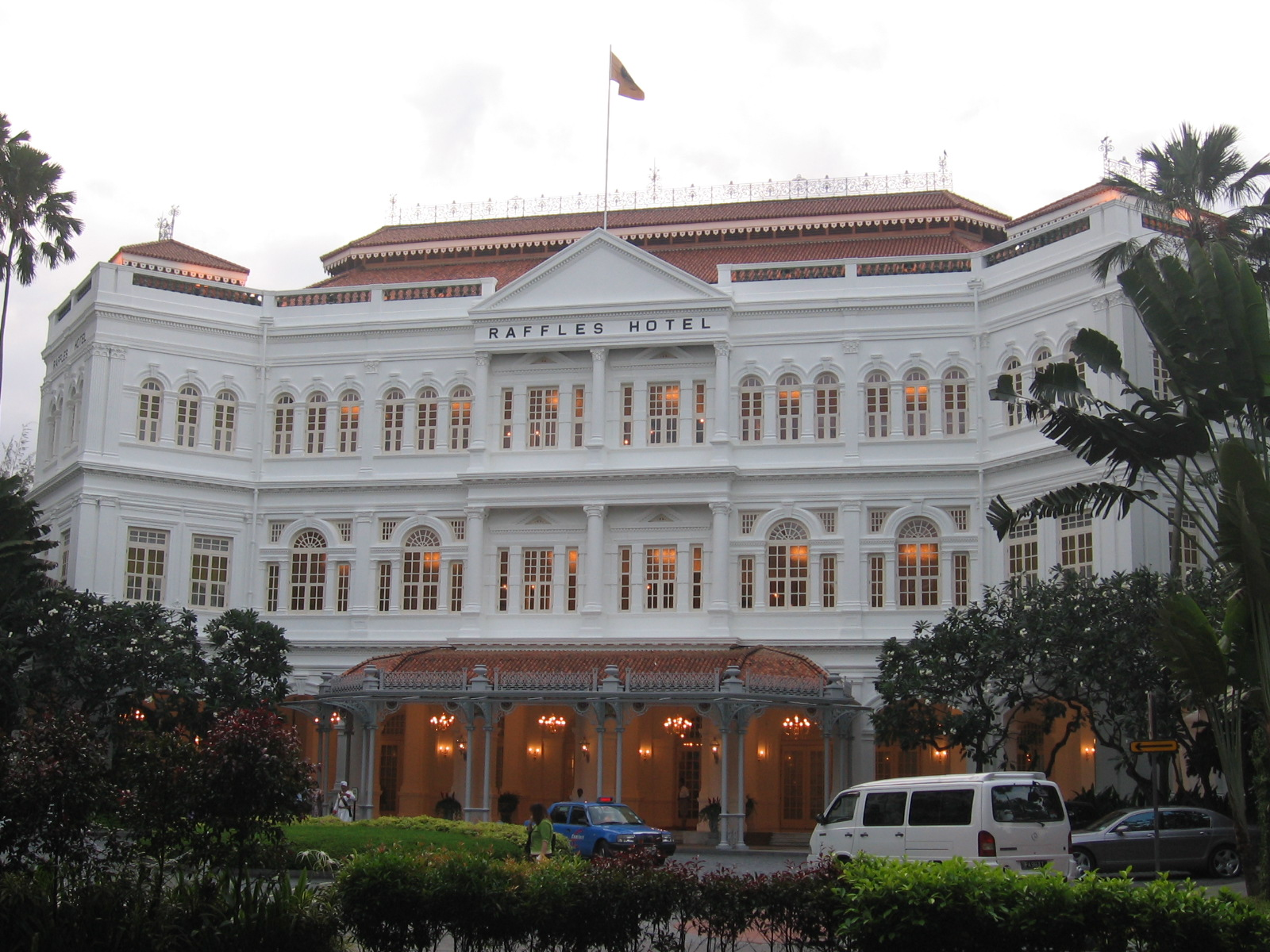
One of Swan and Maclaren's most prominent projects was the Raffles Hotel, now a national monument.

The Raffles Hotel was one of the first of the numerous projects by Bidwell under Swan and Maclaren, which was to build a substantial number of buildings in a large variety of architectural styles. The firm was commissioned to rebuild the Teutonia Club in 1900 in its new location on Scotts Road, after it moved from its location near Raffles Hotel on North Bridge Road. Bidwell applied the south German architectural style in his design of the clubhouse. In Singapore's downtown area, Bidwell also designed the three-storey Stamford House (formerly known as the Oranje Building), completed in 1904.

By 1904, Swan and Maclaren was the largest architectural firm in Singapore. In 1905, Swan and Maclaren worked on the extensions and rebuilding of the Victoria Memorial Hall. In the same year, the Chesed-El Synagogue on Oxley Rise was built. In 1907, the Singapore Cricket Club was extended and refurbished, and the 'Eastern Extension' (later 'Telegraph House', today Sofitel 'So Singapore) on 35 Robinson Road was constructed. In that year, the firm also designed and built one of the largest shops in early Singapore, the John Little department store in Raffles Place, located on the opposite side of the square from Robinson & Co. Between 1906 and 1912, Swan and Maclaren rebuilt the Saint Joseph's Church on Victoria Street, dedicated to the Lady of Fatimah, in the Gothic style. In 1911, Bidwell left Swan and Maclaren to establish his own practice. By then, he was the most important architect in Singapore.

=== After RAJ Bidwell ===
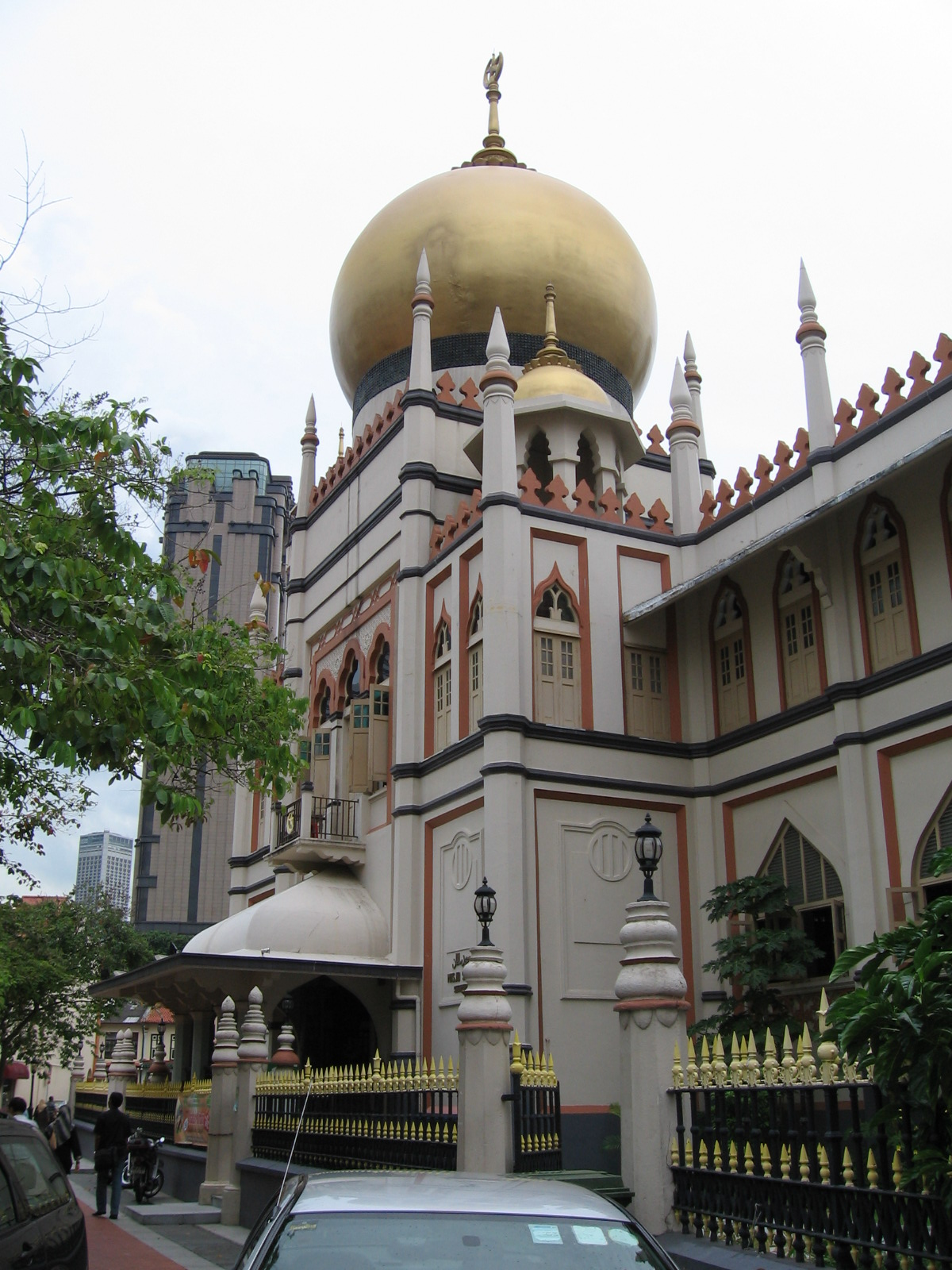
Sultan Mosque in Kampong Glam

In 1913, Swan and Maclaren built a large villa for the Chinese businessman Eu Tong Sen on Mount Sophia. The Eu Villa was built at a grand cost of $1 million.

In the years between World Wars I and II, the firm continued to lead the local market with projects such as the Sultan Mosque (1924–28), Ocean Building (1923), Hongkong Bank Chambers (now HSBC Building) (1925), Prinsep Street Presbyterian Church (1930) and the Singapore Turf Club (1934). In 1927 they completed the construction of the ‘Eastern Extension’ at 35 Robinson Road (later to be known as Telegraph House), the intersection of the ten most important overseas telegraph cables. It is today the (Sofitel) So Singapore. Swan and Maclaren also designed the Cenotaph, a granite memorial at the Esplanade Park that commemorates the soldiers who died in World War I. Its reverse side was inscribed with the names of soldiers who died in World War II.

After World War II, Swan and Maclaren remained important continuing with projects such as Singapore Polytechnic's original campus at Prince Edward Road. They did, however lose some of its dominance due to increased competition from both local and foreign companies.

=== Since 1999 ===
In May 1999, Swan and Maclaren Architects was awarded the architectural tender for the new National Library building on Victoria Street to replace the main library on Stamford Road that was demolished. It was shortlisted out of five for the final selection in National Library Board's architectural design competition, from the 30 firms that made submissions. In September 2000, the firm's team leader Ken Yeang ended his partnership with Swan and Maclaren Architects, which had originally been contracted to see the project through to completion. Subsequently, NLB released the firm from its contract, and called for new tenders for the construction of the new National Library building. The National Library building was eventually opened on 22 July 2005, after three years of construction.

== List of projects ==
=== Singapore ===
==== National monuments ====
- Chesed-El Synagogue (1905)
- Chinese High School Clock Tower Building (1919)
- Convent of the Holy Infant Jesus (1854, 1890, 1913, 1951)
- Goodwood Park Hotel (1900)
- Prinsep Street Presbyterian Church (1930)
- Raffles Hotel (1899)
- Sri Mariamman Temple (1916)
- Sri Srinivasa Perumal Temple (1961–66)
- St Andrew's Cathedral (1952, 1983)
- St Joseph's Church (1906–12, 1938, 1956)
- Masjid Sultan (1924–28)
- Tao Nan School (1910; Armenian Street)
- Telok Ayer Chinese Methodist Church (1924)
- Victoria Memorial Hall and Theatre (1905, 1954–58)

==== Other projects ====
- Alkaff Arcade (1909)
- American International Building (1958)
- 23 Amber Road
- Cenotaph, Singapore (1922)
- Centrepoint (Orchard Road)
- Chin Leong Tang Temple (1920)
- Chinese High School (1919)
- Civilian War Memorial (1964)
- Cycle & Carriage Building (1984)
- David Elias Building (1928)
- Ee Hoe Hean Club (1927; Bukit Pasoh Road)
- Eu Villa (1913)
- Fairfield Methodist Girls' School (1920–21; Neil Road)
- Gleneagles Hospital (1950, 1959, 1980)
- Grand Hotel (Still Road)
- Great Southern Hotel (1936; now Yue Hwa Building)
- Hongkong Bank Chambers (1919–1925, 1979–82; renamed to Hong Kong Bank Building, now HSBC Building)
- Hong Leong Building (1974)
- Institute of Education (1929; Bukit Timah Road)
- Istana Woodneuk (1935)
- Kelly & Walsh Building (1935)
- John Little (1907; Raffles Place)
- Kampong Kapor Methodist Church (1929)
- Kheng Chiu Building (1963; Beach Road)
- Liat Towers (1979)
- Majestic Theatre (1928; New Bridge Road)
- Malayan Banking Chambers (1910)
- Manmathan Karunessvera Temple (1932–35)
- Mount Alvernia Hospital (1960)
- MPH Building (1908)
- National Library (1999; Victoria Street) Initially awarded the tender but contract was subsequently terminated.
- Novena Church (1950)
- Ocean Building (1923, 1974)
- Ocean Towers (1999)
- Shophouses on Syed Alwi Road (1921)
- Singapore Chinese Girls' School (1920s; Cairnhill Road)
- Singapore Cricket Club (1884, 1907–21, 1922–23)
- Singapore Island Country Club
- Singapore Railway Station & Hotel (1932; now Tanjong Pagar Railway Station)
- Singapore Recreation Club (late 1970s)
- Singapore Rubber House (1960, 1978)
- Singapore Turf Club (1934; Dunearn Road)
- St Anthony's Convent (Queen Street)
- St Patrick's School chapel (1932)
- Stamford House (1904)
- Tamil Methodist Episcopal Church (1925)
- Telecoms Building (1927)
- Telephone House (1907)
- Terraces (128A-H) on Cairnhill Road
- Thong Teck Building (1972)
- Times House (1958; River Valley Road)
- United World College of Southeast Asia (1963–64, 1981, 1982, 1984)
- Waterboat House (1919; now The Fullerton Waterboat House)

=== Malaysia ===
- Bok House (1929; Ampang Road, Kuala Lumpur, Malaya; demolished 2006)
- Cenotaph, Penang (1929)
- Electra House, Kuching (1965)
- George Town Dispensary, George Town, Penang (1923)
- Pak Peng Cinema (burnt down in 1970s and rebuilt as Rex Cinema), Kuala Lumpur, (1924)
- St Andrew's Church, Kuala Lumpur (1918)
- Victoria Institution, Kuala Lumpur (1929; present building)
- Bukit Chagar RTS station (2026)
