= Electra House (Malaysia) =

Shopping mall in Kuching, Sarawak, Malaysia

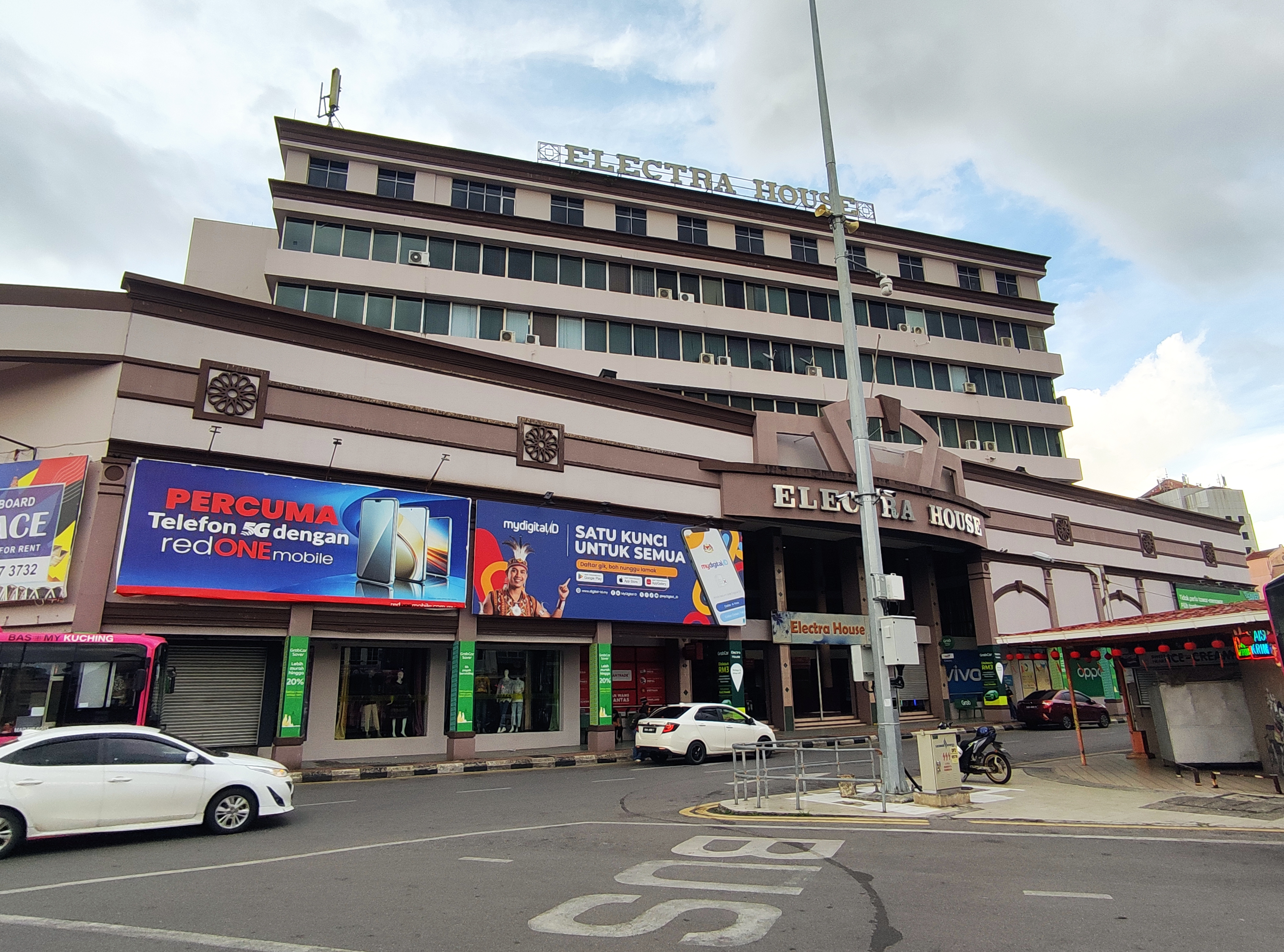
- Location: Kuching, Kuching Division, Sarawak, Malaysia
- Coordinates: 1°33′33″N 110°20′34″E
- Address: Jalan Power, 93000 Kuching, Sarawak, Malaysia
- Opened: 1965; 61 years ago
- Developer: Swan & Maclaren
- Owner: Electra House Sdn. Bhd.
- Floors: 3 (shoplots); 6 (car park, offices and open-air)
- Public transit: SM14 Hikmah Exchange (to be completed)

Electra House is a shopping mall located in Kuching, Sarawak, Malaysia, owned by Electra House Sdn. Bhd. and developed by Swan & Maclaren. It is known as the first shopping mall in the city, built on the site of Kuching's first main electrical power station. The complex officially opened in 1965.

== History ==
Kuching's first main electrical power station (known as Sarawak Energy since 2007) that existed cicra 1919-1922 was notable for its 68-foot-tall twin chimneys. The facility was established to support the installation of permanent electrical street lighting in the town centre. During 1962, Electra House Sdn. Bhd. was established, as part of an urban planning initiative, the power station was decommissioned and relocated, making way for the construction of Electra House. The shopping mall was completed in 1965 by the Singaporean architectural firm, Swan and Maclaren at a cost of RM2.8 million. It became the first shopping mall in both Kuching and Sarawak following Sarawak’s entry into the Federation of Malaysia. The official opening was officiated by Tan Sri Datuk Amar Stephen Kalong Ningkan, the first Chief Minister of Sarawak.

Due to its strategic location near the main public transport hub, Electra House reached the height of its popularity during the 1960s and 1970s. However, in the 1980s, with the emergence of more modern and larger shopping complexes, such as Wisma Saberkas, Wisma Hopoh, Wisma Satok, Kuching Plaza, and Sarawak Plaza, equipped with full air conditioning, Electra House began to experience a steady decline. Although renovations were carried out in 1996, the mall has continued to see a significant drop in visitors up to the present day.

== Architecture ==
Electra House is a mixed-use building featuring three spacious lower floors designated for commercial retail, a mid-level parking facility, and five upper floors serving as office spaces and an open-air platform. A fountain was once located at one side of the building, but it was dismantled after 1996.

The interior design of Electra House combines both air-conditioned and open-air sections. The building is not equipped with escalators but does have elevators. However, staircases are the primary means of accessing the upper levels.

== Tenants ==
In the earlier years of Electra House, the commercial section housed a variety of establishments including photography studios (Kodak), branded watch retailers, pharmacies, tailoring shops, and vinyl record stores (Borneo Records). The office levels were once occupied by Malaysia Airlines. Near the rooftop level, there was also a restaurant named Le Coq d’Or, which served hybridised Anglo-style cuisine.

After the 1980s, many businesses relocated to more strategic and densely populated areas, resulting in an increasing number of vacant shoplots. 2010s, only a few salons and clothing stores remain in operation. Since 1993, the office levels have been occupied by the Sarawak Rivers Board.
