= St Andrew's Church, Kuala Lumpur =

Church in Kuala Lumpur, Malaysia

Coordinates: 3°08′57″N 101°42′08″E

St. Andrew's Presbyterian Church
- International Church of Kuala Lumpur
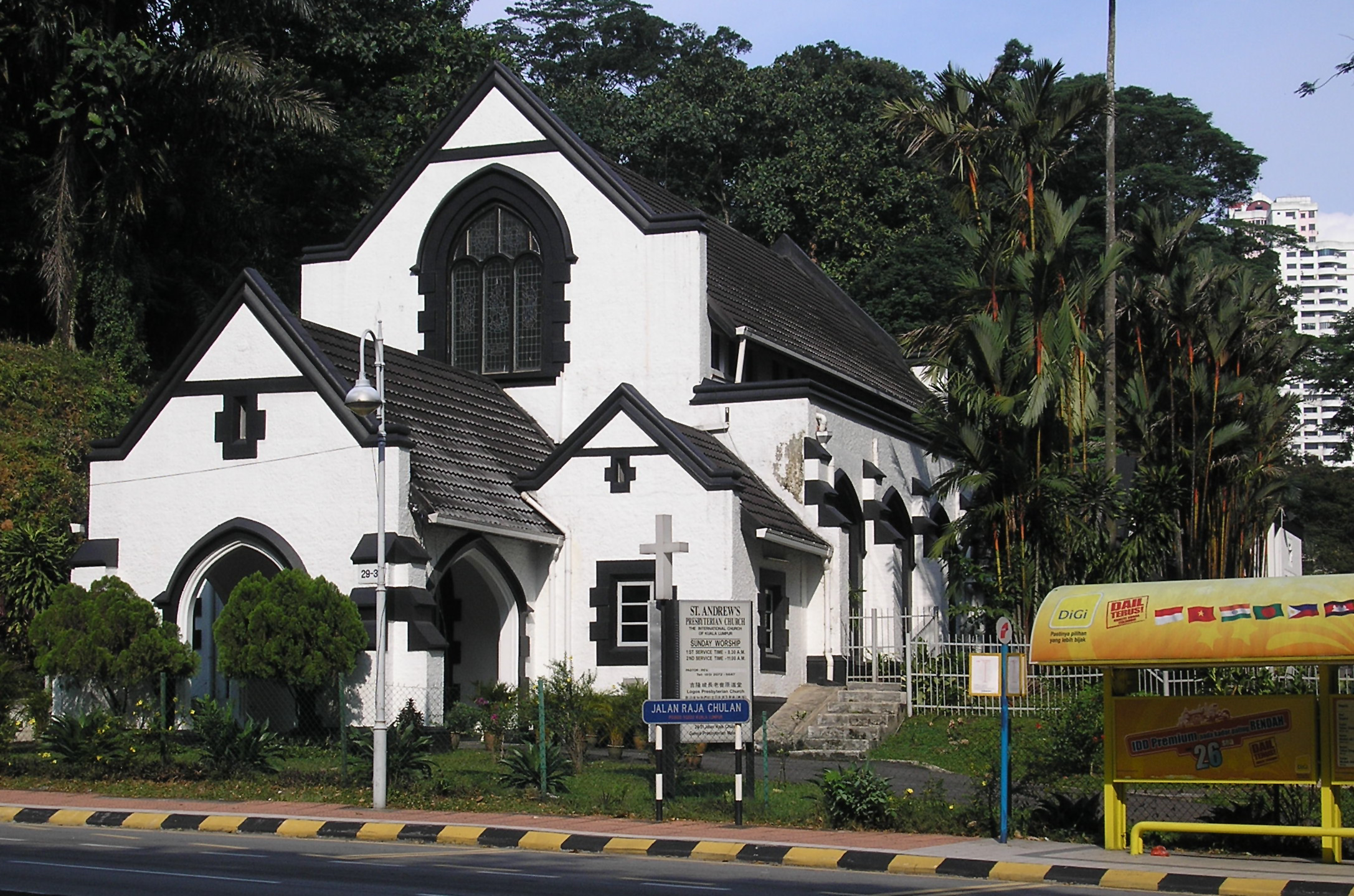
- St. Andrew's Presbyterian Church, Kuala Lumpur
- St. Andrew's Presbyterian Church
- Address: 29/31, Jalan Raja Chulan, 50200 Kuala Lumpur, Malaysia
- Denomination: Presbyterian
- Website: https://www.standrewschurch.org.my/

Architecture
- Architect: Swan and Maclaren
- Architectural type: Gothic
- Completed: 1918

Clergy
- Pastor: Rev. Tan Kay Hoe

St Andrew's Church is a Presbyterian church situated in Jalan Raja Chulan, Kuala Lumpur, Malaysia.

== History ==
Prior to the completion of St Andrew's Church in 1918, occasional Presbyterian services were held Kuala Lumpur beginning in 1902 in various locations conducted by ministers from Penang, including Rev. William Murray, and from Singapore.

In 1915 the first Presbyterian minister, Rev. A. D. Harcus, formerly minister of John Knox Church, Stepney, London, was appointed to the pastorate of Kuala Lumpur, and was formerly inducted in 1916 at a ceremony conducted at the YMCA building in Kuala Lumpur by members of the commission of the Presbytery of London North.

Rev. Harcus oversaw the fundraising and building of St. Andrew's Church which began on 3 October 1917 with the laying of the foundation stone on land allocated on Weld Road, as it was then called, by the British administration. The design and construction was carried out by architects, Swan and Maclaren.

On 17 April 1918 an opening ceremony was held at the church in the presence of Sir Anthony Young, High Commissioner of the Malay States attended by 250 people. Later, a Manse was erected in the grounds of the church in 1921, and in the following year a memorial tablet was installed inside the church with the name of residents of Selangor who died during the First World War. The early congregation was predominantly British including a large Scottish contingent.

In subsequent years various changes were made to the church. In 1939 the original reed organ installed in 1917 was replaced by a pipe organ. During the Japanese Occupation in the Second World War the church was used as a storehouse, and metal objects including organ pipes, the brass lectern, and four of the five memorial tablets were looted.

As part of the church's 100-year anniversary celebrations in 2017 a time capsule was recovered from under the foundation stone, and opened with a view to replacing it with a new capsule. Inscribed "1917" it was found to contain a Bible, hymn book, a copy of the church magazine, a copy of the Malay Mail, and coins of the local currency.

== Architecture ==
The church is built in the neo gothic style including pointed arch windows and doorways. The exterior is covered in pebble dash and cast concrete facings. The nave can accommodate 150 worshippers, and the roof is supported by rafters made from chengal hardwood which are part of the original construction. Stained glass windows were donated in 1956 by a member of the congregation, Sir John Hay, in memory of those who lost their lives in the Malayan Emergency.
