= American International Building, Singapore =

Office building in Singapore

- The American International Building (centre)
- Interactive map of the American International Building, Singapore area

General information
- Coordinates: 1.28206°N 103.8511°E
- Groundbreaking: October 1955
- Construction started: 26 April 1956
- Completed: December 1957
- Opening: 19 April 1958

Design and construction
- Architecture firm: John Graham & Company and Swan & Maclaren Architects
- Main contractor: Paul Y. Construction

American International Building was an office building at the corner of Robinson Road and Telegraph Street in Singapore. Opened in 1958, it housed the Singapore offices of American International Assurance. It was demolished to make way for the AIA Tower.

== History ==
The American International Assurance Company announced in April 1951 that it was to build a nine-storey headquarters at Robinson Road for its Southeast Asia operations. A 12.13 square feet (1.127 m^{2}) plot of land for the building was purchased in last November. The clearing of the site at the junction of Robinson Road and Telegraph Street began in November 1953. Construction was estimated to cost more than $5 million and the building was to be 12-storeys tall. The ground floor was to be "devoted to garden space" and the entire building was to be air-conditioned. American International Assurance was to occupy the ground and mezzanine floors following its completion. In the meantime, the company had its offices housed in the newly completed Finlayson House. Piling work for the building, which was to be completed by May 1957, began in October 1955. Then-Commissioner-General for Southeast Asia Robert Heatlie Scott laid its foundation stone on 26 April 1956.

The building was designed by architectural firms John Graham & Company and Swan & Maclaren Architects while Paul Y. Construction served as the general contractors. The materials used in the construction included granite sourced from Sweden, marble sourced from Italy, aluminium sourced from England, electronic lift controls and air-conditioning made in the United States and wood veneers and screens made in Japan. The land on which the building was to be built was reclaimed. During construction, part of an old seawall erected around 1843 was uncovered. The building featured aluminium sheathes designed as horizontal and vertical louvres, which were "angled to keep out the sun's direct rays but at the same time to admit ample light."

Over three-quarters of the 12,000 sqft ground floor was occupied by a car park and a garden that was "framed by marble walls, aluminium grilles and stainless steel columns, while the rest of the floor featured a marble lift lobby and a staircase leading to the second storey. The building featured three lifts, accompanied by recessed ceiling fixtures, which could travel 500ft per minute. The floors were covered with terrazzo tiles "tinted a pleasantly warm tan". Acoustic tiles were used on the ceilings to "reduce noise to the minimum and achieve the resultant efficiency from employees. Every floor had 46 telephone outlets, water fountains powered with electricity and a mail chute. Shower stalls offering both hot and cold water, an "entirely new feature in Singapore office buildings", were also installed on every floor.

The building was completed in December 1957 and opened on 19 April 1958 by Robert Heatlie Scott. The opening ceremony was attended by over 700 guests. By 3 January of that year, American International Assurance, as well as several other tenants, had already moved into the building. It was "one of the tallest buildings in Singapore". The offices of the Japan External Trade Organization in Singapore were also housed in the building. On the night of 9 November 1987, an explosion occurred at the building that shattered the glass and damaged the pavement at the front entrance but caused no injuries. A second explosion which caused minimal damage occurred hours after. In both cases, the explosive devices were hidden in flower pots and troughs.

In September 1989, it was announced that the building was to be demolished in the following year to make way for the construction of a skyscraper modelled after the America International Building in New York City. By then, the building had been "dwarfed by surrounding skyscrapers such as the OUB Centre and the OCBC Centre in nearby Raffles Place." The AIA Tower was officially opened in 1993.
