= Parochial House of St Joseph's Church =

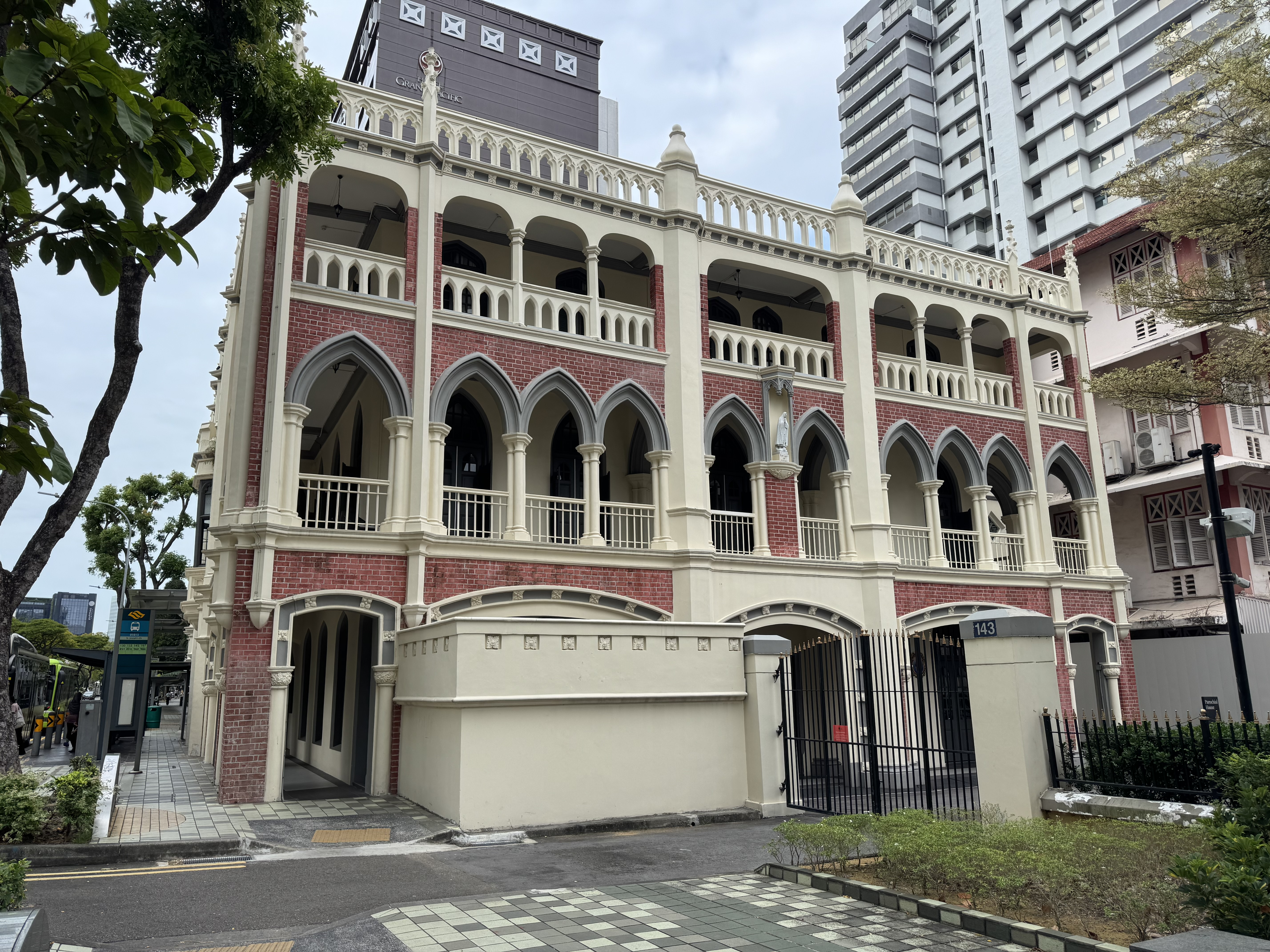
The building in 2026

The Parochial House of St Joseph's Church is a building on Victoria Street, Singapore. Currently the lodgings for the rector of the Saint Joseph's Church, it previously served as the headquarters of the local Portuguese mission.

== Description ==
The three-storey tall building was inspired by Portuguese Baroque architecture. Its façade features pointed Gothic arches, as well as the coat of arms of João Paulino de Azevedo e Castro, who served as the Bishop of Macau and contributed funds towards the building's construction. The roof features pinnacles decorated with crockets. A roundel with the letters "PM", which stand for "Portuguese Mission", inscribed on it can be found above the main entrance. The building also contains the throne of the Bishop of Macau.

The building features a carved wooden grand staircase. An Azulejo tile, a common feature of Portuguese churches, depicting the Baptism of Jesus can be found on the ground floor, while a statue of Saint Joseph can be found on the second floor. Also on the second storey is an oriel window facing Bain Street, with Azulejo tiles depicting the Immaculate Conception and Sacred Heart being placed on the walls on either side of the window. The third floor features a private chapel. A reredos depicting the Annunciation is situated behind the chapel's altar. The building features nine sets of Azulejo tiles in total.

== History ==
The building was completed in 1912 and served as the local headquarters for the Portuguese Mission. The ground floor housed the Parochial Library and the Parish Canteen, with the latter opening in 1960. In 1965, the canteen hosted a wedding reception for the first time. It continued to serve as the mission's headquarters until 1981, and then as the residence of the Bishop of Macau until 1999, when the mission left Singapore. It was then converted from a parish church to a church of devotion.

The building was gazetted for conservation by the Urban Redevelopment Authority on 30 June 2016. In the following year, it was closed for renovations. The parochial house was reopened in 2024.
