= Specialists' Shopping Centre =

Defunct shopping mall in Singapore

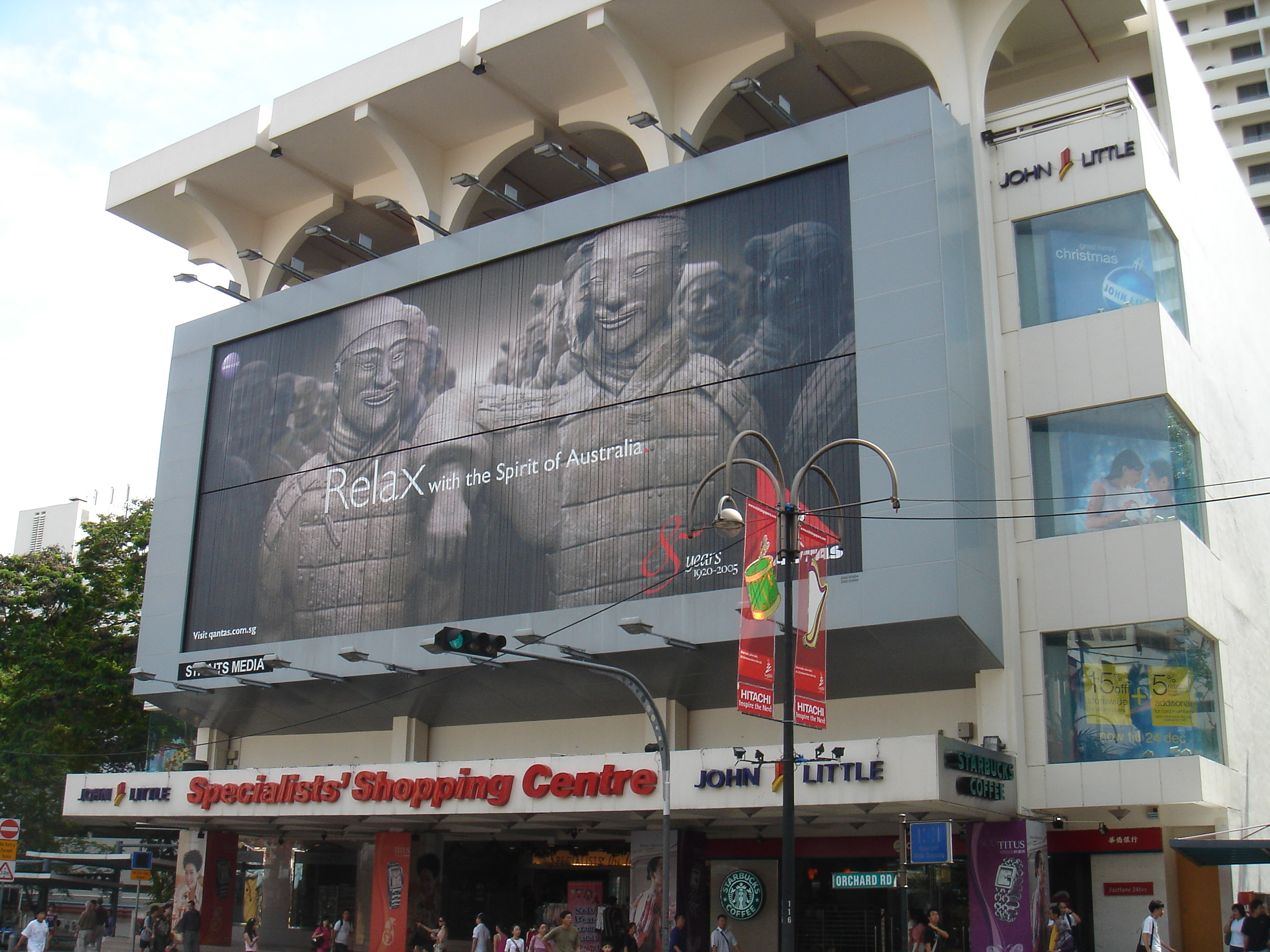
- The mall seen in 2005

- Location within Singapore

General information
- Status: Demolished
- Location: Orchard Road, Orchard Planning Area, Singapore, 277 Orchard Road, Singapore 238858
- Coordinates: 1°18′03.8″N 103°50′20.0″E
- Opening: 1972; 54 years ago
- Closed: 2007; 19 years ago
- Demolished: 2008; 18 years ago
- Owner: Specialists' Centre Private Ltd; OCBC Bank
- Operator: OCBC Bank

Technical details
- Floor count: 6 storeys + basement + 20-storey hotel
- Floor area: 15,317 square feet (1,423.0 m^{2})

Design and construction
- Developer: OCBC Bank

Other information
- Number of stores: 70
- Number of anchors: 7
- Parking: 344

The Specialists' Shopping Centre was the oldest shopping centre on Orchard Road, a shopping area of Singapore. The largest tenants were Hotel Phoenix Singapore and John Little. The Visitor's Guide of Singapore described it as "revered". It was demolished to make way for newer developments in 2008.

== History ==
Opened in 1972 on the former site of the Pavilion Theatre. The mall was originally named Specialists due to the concentration of medical specialists in its early days.

== Stores ==
The John Little store was Singapore's oldest department store. The store opened in 1845 in Commercial Square. The main store was in the Specialists' Shopping Centre although there were four branch stores. The store is no longer in Raffles Place. Guidebooks refer to the prices as "very up-to-date" or reasonable. The John Little store displayed bargain goods in the outdoor sections of the ground floor.

Specialty goods including, but not limited to Famous Amos cookies, winter clothing, and golf equipment are available. Leather goods, tools, household items, and a Korean restaurant are also located in the shopping centre. A Starbucks café was located in the shopping centre. A branch of the OCBC Bank was also located in the shopping centre.

== Hotel ==
Behind the shopping centre was the Hotel Phoenix Singapore, a "superior 4-star hotel" with 392 rooms. The hotel was unique among hotels in that it offers an Intelligent Keycard which allows prepaid access to the bus and MRT system equivalent to the EZ-Link card. As such, patrons were given the same EZ-link discount fares. The Intelligent Keycard also acted as one's hotel room key. No other hotel was participating in this scheme though it may change in the future.

== Redevelopment ==
As one of the smaller shopping centres in Orchard Road and located adjacent to vacant land used for a car park, the property was slated for redevelopment. It was reported that the shopping centre may be vacated by the middle of 2007. One of the requirements that must be overcome by receiving an exemption was the height limitation of 16 storeys for the site. The OCBC Bank, as one of the owners of the property, had restrictions in development. The Banking Amendment Regulations (2004) restricted demolition and rebuilding of structures to more than 20% larger. Redevelopment plans had to include a hotel as hotel use was safeguarded by the authorities. Speculation regarding the site's redevelopment had been ongoing for several years and included connecting a redeveloped site with The Centrepoint, a shopping centre across the road and owned by the same owners as the Specialists' Shopping Centre.

== Demolition ==
On 9 July 2007, John Little closed its branch at the Specialists' Shopping Centre, after operating for more than 20 years. In 2008, the shopping centre was demolished to make way for newer developments because it was surrounded by Orchard Central and 313@Somerset sites. Demolition began on 1 January 2008 and ended on 20 March 2008. Part of Specialists' Shopping Centre site was used for the development works of the new Orchard Gateway shopping mall which started in 2011 and completed in 2014.
