= Bok House =

Mansion on Jalan Ampang in Kuala Lumpur, Malaysia

- Location within Malaysia

General information
- Status: Demolished
- Location: Kuala Lumpur, Malaysia, 121, Jalan Ampang, Kuala Lumpur, 50450 Kuala Lumpur, Federal Territory of Kuala Lumpur, Malaysia, Kuala Lumpur, Malaysia
- Coordinates: 3°09′30.5″N 101°42′33.7″E
- Current tenants: Le Coq d'Or (1958–2001)
- Construction started: 1926
- Completed: 1929
- Opened: 1929
- Closed: 2001
- Demolished: 2006
- Owner: Chua Cheng Bok
- Landlord: Chua Cheng Bok

Technical details
- Floor count: 2

Design and construction
- Architecture firm: Swan & Maclaren

Other information
- Number of restaurants: 1
- Number of bars: 1

The Bok House was an old mansion on Jalan Ampang in Kuala Lumpur, Malaysia, demolished in 2006. The compound where the building stood is a block away from the Petronas Twin Towers, owned by a private trustee managed by the Bok family.

== History ==
Bok House, built in 1929, was a colonial mansion located along Jalan Ampang, Kuala Lumpur. It was a masterpiece of classical Palladian architecture, commissioned by Chua Cheng Bok, a wealthy tin tycoon. For decades, it housed the famous French restaurant Le Coq d’Or, becoming a symbol of sophistication and high society in pre- and post-independence Malaysia.The mansion was designed by Swan & Maclaren in 1926 and it was completed in 1929 for a local millionaire, the Cycle & Carriage owner Chua Cheng Bok. In the 1958 and up until its closure in 2001, the mansion housed an upscale restaurant and bar called the Le Coq d'Or.

== Demolition and controversy ==
In 2001, the building was abandoned by the restaurant operator. Being located on a high-value land, plan for redevelopment emerged but it was opposed by local conservation groups. Initially, the local government denied there were plans to redevelop the land and hence, the possibility of demolishing the building. Local conservation groups later tried to lobby the government to gazette the mansion for its historical value but to no avail.

On December 15 2006, the mansion was demolished, resulting in public outcry. The building was 77 years old when demolished.

After demolition of the mansion, on 21 December 2006 Culture, Arts and Heritage Minister Datuk Seri Dr Rais Yatim challenged dissenters to prove that Bok House is of historic value. According to him:

"The cost of rehabilitating Bok House will be high and there is no significant history or aesthetic value attached to the building"

"The Government could also not save Bok House from being demolished because it is privately-owned and not registered as a heritage building."

The list of registered heritage buildings in Malaysia is in fact determined by the government.

The plot of land where Bok House once stood remain vacant till late 2012, when it was boarded up and construction on a proposed W Hotel commenced. The W Kuala Lumpur Hotel was opened in 2017.
