= John Little (department store) =

Defunct chain of department stores in Singapore

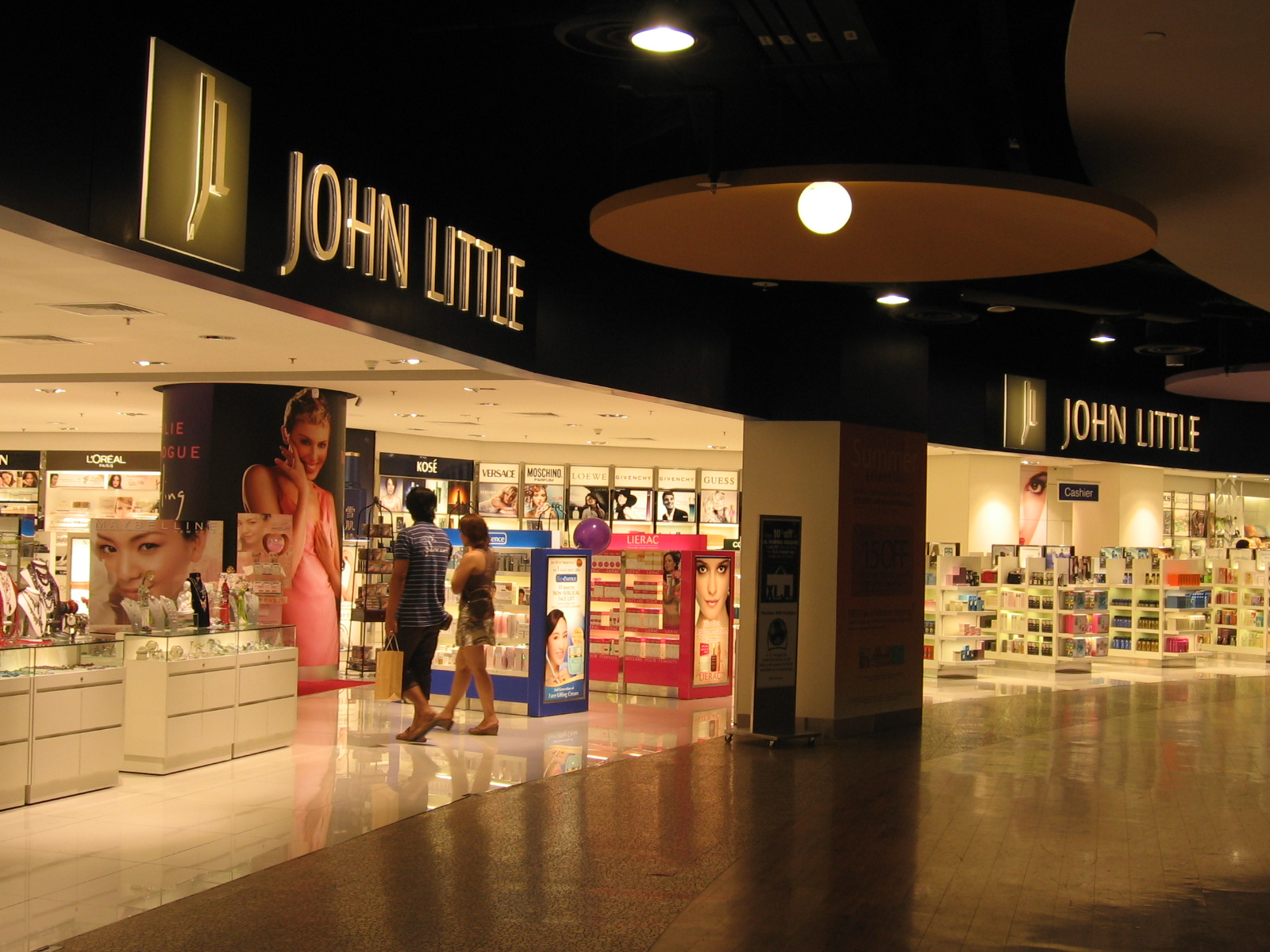
- John Little's Marina Square store
- Formerly: Little, Cursetjee & Co.; John Little & Co.
- Industry: Retail
- Founded: 30 August 1845; 181 years ago in Commercial Square, Singapore, Straits Settlements
- Founders: John Martin Little; Cursetjee Frommurzee; Matthew Little
- Defunct: 31 December 2016
- Fate: Acquired by Robinson & Co. Limited
- Headquarters: Singapore
- Owner: Robinson & Co. Limited

John Little was a former chain of department stores in Singapore. Established in 1845, John Little was the oldest department store in Singapore. The John Little chain was acquired and owned by Robinson & Co. Limited in 1955.

== History ==
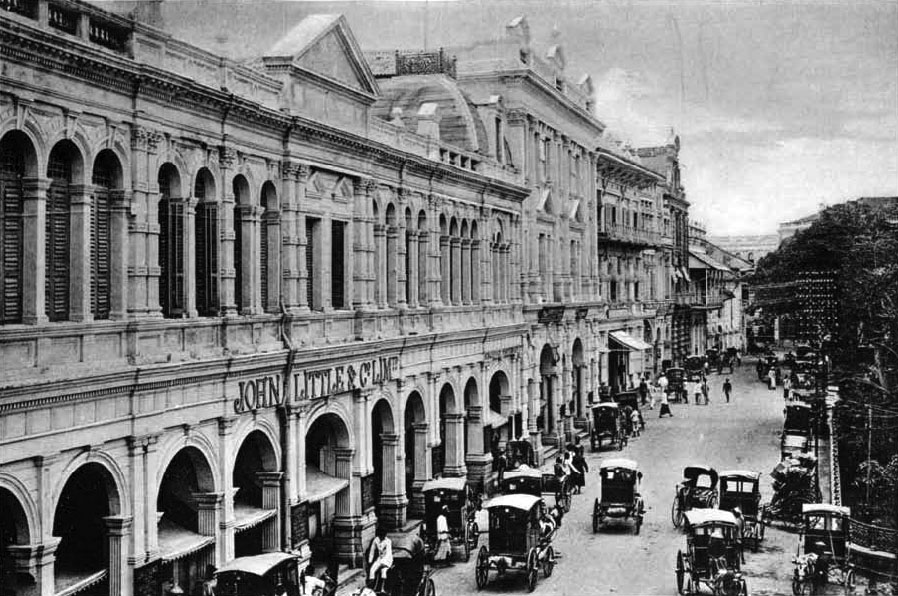
John Little & Co.'s department store at Commercial Square, Singapore, c. 1900

In 1842, John Martin Little worked for his uncle Francis S. Martin who started a retail business at Commercial Square (now Raffles Place). In 1845, Francis S. Martin sold his business to Little and Cursetjee Frommurze, a well-known Parsee merchant, to form Little, Cursetjee & Co..

On 30 August 1845, Little and Frommurze started their business as auctioneers and commission agents, and offered services in retail as well as auction of properties such as spice plantations and valuable household furniture. Shoppers could buy tickets to plays, musicals and other performances. Little, Cursetjee & Co. became a popular hangout for locals to hold meetings, and functioned like the modern-day equivalent of a central box office.

On 30 June 1853, Little and Frommurze ended their eight-year partnership. Frommurze set up Cursetjee & Co. and hired Philip Robinson, who later founded Spicer & Robinson, which became Robinsons. Little formed John Little & Co., and John's brother, Matthew Little, was made a partner. The business continued in the same direction and premises. In January 1894, John Little & Co. Ltd was registered in London by Harwood and Stephenson, with a capital of £75,000 in £20 shares.

As Singapore grew as a trading port in the late 19th century, John Little expanded in the same period. In addition to retail, John Little also operated a car business, a motor garage, a furniture factory, a café and a beauty salon. From its original one-storey premises in Raffles Place, the store expanded to occupy another floor.

In the early 20th century, John Little also set up branches in Malaya; there were branches in Kuala Lumpur (1914, near today's Market Square and Masjid Jamek), Penang (1926), and Ipoh (1929). However, the advent of World War II and subsequent Japanese Occupation resulted in the closure of these branches and used by Daimaru.

After the Japanese occupation of Singapore ended in 1945, it took some time for John Little to re-open for business due to lack of manpower and merchandise. In June 1946, John Little resumed business, and subsequently registered such good sales that the store declared a 20% dividend for its ordinary shareholders in 1948.

In 1955, John Little was acquired by Robinsons & Co. The store was relaunched as JL on 29 August 1987 with a new logo, new image and merchandise selection.

By 2003, John Little had eight stores at Plaza Singapura, Specialists' Shopping Centre, Northpoint, White Sands, Causeway Point, Jurong Point, Compass Point and Parkway Parade.

In April 2008, the Al-Futtaim Group bought 88% of the shares of Robinsons & Co. at S$7.20 per share.

Its main store moved from Raffles Place to several locations before moving into Specialists' Shopping Centre until its closure in July 2007.

In 2015, Al-Futtaim announced that JL's Marina Square and Tiong Bahru Plaza store will be closed due to lack of businesses and renovation. The Marina Square store closed on 26 April, while Tiong Bahru Plaza store closed in August 2015. John Little will also close Jurong Point outlet in August 2016 for the transfer to BHG. By the end of 2016, its last store in Plaza Singapura will also be closed.

The chain's last store in Plaza Singapura was closed in the end of 2016.

In 2016, the Robinsons company announced that they would be changing the John Little brand to a pop up store.

== Stores' location ==
- Main store at Specialists' Shopping Centre along Orchard Road closed on 9 July 2007.
- Jurong Point store: Jurong Point store to be replaced by BHG in August 2016
- Marina Square store: John Little's largest outlet which opened in June 2007 and closed on 26 April 2015 (Closed due to building's renovation works);
- Plaza Singapura store: Plaza Singapura store closed 2 January 2017, replaced by Muji Flagship.
- Tiong Bahru Plaza store: Tiong Bahru Plaza store closed in August 2015 (Closed due to building's renovation works and poor business)
- White Sands store: White Sands store closed in July 2007
