= Wisma Hopoh =

Shopping mall in Kuching, Sarawak, Malaysia

- Coordinates: 1°33′15″N 110°20′26″E
- Address: Jalan P. Ramlee, 93400, Kuching, Sarawak, Malaysia
- Opened: 15 June 1984; 42 years ago
- Developer: Chai Yun Phin Development Sdn. Bhd.
- Owner: Hopoh (Sarawak) Sdn. Bhd.
- Num. of stores: 136 (as of 2023)
- Floors: 4 (tenants); 1 (open air)
- Website: www.hepo.org

Wisma Hopoh
- Traditional Chinese: 河婆大廈
- Simplified Chinese: 河婆大厦
Transcriptions
Standard Mandarin
- Hanyu Pinyin: Hépó Dàshà

Hopoh Complex, commonly known as Wisma Hopoh, is a shopping mall located in Kuching, Sarawak, Malaysia. The property is owned by Hopoh (Sarawak) Sdn. Bhd. and was developed by Chai Yun Phin Development Sdn. Bhd.. The complex officially opened on 15 June 1984.

== History ==
Wisma Hopoh was named after Hepo (Chinese: 河婆), a town in Jiexi County, Guangdong, China, which is also the ancestral home of Hopo Chinese in Sarawak. Wisma Hopoh was jointly developed by the Sarawak Hopoh Association (simplified Chinese: 砂拉越河婆同乡会; traditional Chinese: 砂拉越河婆同鄉會, Malay: Persatuan Hopoh Sarawak), Datuk Lee Chee Min (Chinese: 李志明), and Chai Yun Phin (Chinese: 蔡永平), with each party holding a one-third stake in the project. On 8 September 1980, Hopoh (Sarawak) Sdn. Bhd. (Chinese: 砂拉越河婆有限公司) was established, while Chai Yun Phin Development Sdn. Bhd. (simplified Chinese: 蔡永平发展有限公司; traditional Chinese: 蔡永平發展有限公司) was entrusted with the management and implementation of the construction project.

The architectural plans for Wisma Hopoh were submitted for approval in 1977. However, the project was delayed due to a sharp increase in the prices of construction materials, which caused the building costs to exceed the original budget. Construction eventually commenced on 13 June 1981.

After several years of development, Wisma Hopoh was completed in June 1984. An official opening ceremony was held on 15 June of the same year, officiated by the late Sarawak Deputy Chief Minister, Tan Sri Datuk Amar Sim Kheng Hong (simplified Chinese: 沈庆鸿; traditional Chinese: 沈慶鴻), who performed the ribbon-cutting ceremony.

Owing to its strategic location in a prime commercial area, and its proximity to the Kuching North City Hall City Library, St. Teresa's National Secondary School, and Madrasah Melayu Sarawak, Wisma Hopoh enjoyed its heyday throughout the 1980s and 1990s. However, with the emergence of larger and more modern shopping centres from the 2000s onward, the complex has experienced a significant decline in visitor traffic that continues to this day.

== Architecture ==
Wisma Hopoh was originally planned as a nine-storey building. However, due to construction costs exceeding the allocated budget, the work was temporarily halted after the completion of the first five storeys. The remaining four floors were intended to be added at a later stage when circumstances became more favourable, but the expansion was never achieved.

The original layout of Wisma Hopoh consisted of 15 shop units occupying the lower three floors, while the fourth floor housed a department store. Following the closure of the department store in mid-1987, the premises were converted into 55 commercial units for lease and were officially opened on 23 September of the same year. As of 2023, a total of 136 commercial units were in operation within the complex.

The building featured a fully air-conditioned interior and was equipped with facilities such as escalators, lifts, and staircases.

== Tenants ==
Wisma Hopoh housed a variety of commercial establishments, including Oriental Emporium Department Store (simplified Chinese: 英保良东方百货公司; traditional Chinese: 英保良東方百貨公司) (which operated from 1984 to 1987), Kentucky Fried Chicken (which remained in operation until 1 August 2018), the first Lea Centre outlet (simplified Chinese: 丽雅鞋行; traditional Chinese: 麗雅鞋行), Ronnie Optics (simplified Chinese: 罗尼眼镜; traditional Chinese: 羅尼眼鏡), and several tailoring shops. The Wisma Hopoh Management Office was also located on the first floor of the complex.

== Incident ==
- On 13 July 2018, at approximately 6:00 a.m., a fire broke out on the fourth floor of Hopoh Complex. The cause of the fire remains unknown, and no casualties or injuries were reported in the incident.
