= Straits Insurance Building =

Building in Singapore

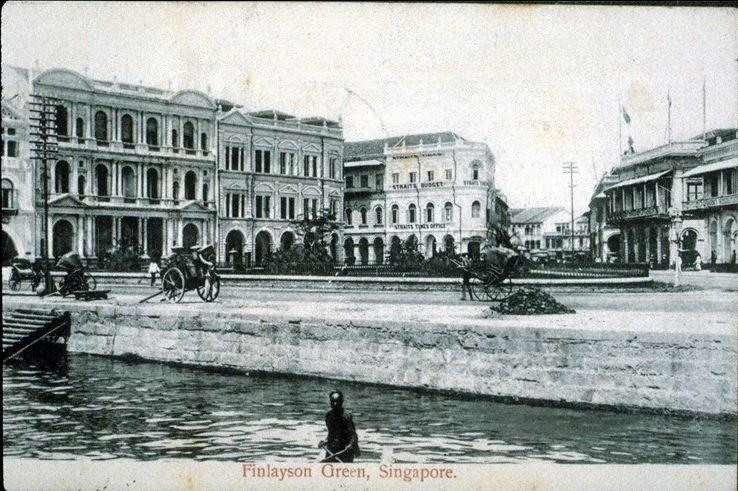
Finlayson Green and the Straits Insurance Building (left), c. 1905

The Straits Insurance Building, later known as 2 Finlayson Green and then as the Asia Building during the Japanese occupation of Singapore, was a building along Finlayson Green in Singapore. Built in 1892, it was described as an "extremely decorous affair", housing the Straits Insurance Company until the winding up of that firm in 1899. The South British Insurance Company then took over the building and remained there until the Japanese invasion and subsequent occupation of Singapore. It was demolished in 1947 to make way for the Asia Insurance Building.

== Description ==
The three-storey building was described in Singapore Free Press And Mercantile Advertiser as "being of the Renaissance type", though writer Julian Davison noted that the newspapers of the day often described "any kind of building with a vaguely Classical mien" as 'Renaissance'. Instead, he writes that the "extremely decorous" structure was designed in the "Victorian Freestyle Classic" style, with "disparate elements drawn from across the Classical spectrum" in addition to "quite a bit of pure invention". It was reportedly in a "very similar" style to the nearby Gresham House. It was also to feature a "symmetrically disposed" façade, in this case "broken up by the lines of the verandahs, and diversified with the free introduction of rounded columns and semi-circular arches. The main entrance featured Ionic columns, built with blocks of dressed granite, which allowed in "as much light as possible" and was flanked on either side by ornamental pediments. The upper floors feature Corinthian columns treated "boldly" and with "great effect."

The ground floor was raised by 3ft above the verandah before it. The building was serviced by a 7ft 6in-wide staircase located just before the entrance hall, which was 80 by 40ft in size and decorated with encaustic tiles. Other amenities included speaking tubes and electronic bells. Behind the hall was an open area with a winding stair made of granite leading up to the staff quarters on the top floor, to be used by the 'servants' who were not to come through the front door. The Straits Insurance Company's 53 by 33ft-large offices were located on the ground floor on the right side. To the left, there was another 53 by 20ft-large office space. The first floor had similar-sized offices, all equipped with lavatories and fireproofed strong rooms. The ceilings on this floor were "decorated in an ornamental manner." Also found on the first floor was the manager's office, a 24 by 18ft room with "highly polished" floring and ornamented with a solid wooden panel dado, and a similarly-arranged meeting room. The top floor housed the company's upper offices, tiffin rooms, kitchens and other "necessary offices" in addition to the staff quarters, which included dining rooms, lavatories and bedrooms accompanied by bathrooms. The doors were made of Borneo teak, while the window frames were made of tampenis. The windows were made of panel glass. Ornamental plasterwork was used in the construction of the company's officers.

== History ==
In the early 1890s, the Straits Fire Insurance Company and the Straits Marine Insurance Company, together the Straits Insurance Company, found that their premises on d'Almeida Street had grown inadequate. The company's board of directors decided on constructing and relocating to a new building, which would be "size sufficient for all their purposes". commissioned surveyor-engineer and architect Archibald Alexander Swan, then practising on his own following the dissolution of Swan & Lermit, to design its new premises along Finlayson Green, which was then a "prime location". This was Swan's last project as architect before he entered a partnership with his former assistant J. W. B. Maclaren, and was a "complete change of direction and anonther step forward in terms of his development as an architect." It was to be one of several "large and stately-looking offices" being built in the Telok Ayer area, alongside the Hongkong and Shanghai Bank Building, the planned Singapore Insurance Company Building which became Gresham House, the Eastern Extension Telegraph Building, the Singapore Land Block, and the Fraser & Neave Building, the lattermost of which was also designed by Swan. The offices were primarily furnished by Powell & Co.

Work on the building began before Swan had submitted the plans for the building, and once this was discovered, Municipal Engineer James MacRitchie stopped the construction and applied for a summons against Crawford Kerr, the company's secretary. It was eventually found that this was the result of an "oversight" on Swan's end for failing to submit the plans on time. Work resumed on the submission of the plans on 26 January 1892. Later in the year, there were concerns raised for the stability of the area due to several landslides, resulting in the delay of works on the Eastern Extension Telegraph Building, though work on the Straits Insurance Building continued as usual, and those fears were eventually quelled. The Free Press opined in August 1892 that the structure, nearing completion but still six to eight months away from being ready for occupation, was a "premises worthy of the town, premises on which no reasonable expense is to be spared," and that with its completion the town could look forward to a "fine line of godowns and places of business extending from Collyer Quay almost to Fort Palmer." Construction work, which cost $50,000, concluded around a year after it began. The building was officially opened on 6 June 1893. By then, the Straits Fire Insurance Company and the Straits Marine Insurance Company were the only "purely local" insurance firms in the country. Much of the additional office space had then yet to be let out. The weekly edition of The Straits Times then commended the design of the building as "worthy" of Swan's reputation, though the insurance firms' decision to open up the building to members of the public for two hours on opening day was criticised.

The Straits Insurance Company began winding up in August 1899. The Finlayson Green building was then acquired by the South British Insurance Company, who moved their offices into the building. The Vacuum Oil Company moved its Singapore offices into the building on 4 July of the following year. The head offices of the Singapore Tramway had moved into the building by June 1903. The Singapore branch of the Mitsui Bussan Kaisha moved into the building by December 1907. The offices of Latham & Co. had moved into the building earlier that year. Publicity Ideas, a publishing company operated by Mrs. D. S. Jackson, had set up shop in the building by February 1914. The company installed an electric lift in the building in November.

The South British Insurance Company was forced to vacate the premises when the Japanese invaded Singapore. During the ensuing occupation, which lasted from 1942 to 1945, the building was known as the Asia Building. The Asano Busan Company and the Sumatra Kaiun Kongsie moved in by October and November 1942, respectively. The Jun-An Shakin Company by April 1943. In the days between the surrender of the Japanese and the return of the British, several buildings, including 2 Finlayson Green, were looted of "every removable thing." As such, when the company resumed operations in Singapore, now on Cecil Street, they found that all their records had been "cleaned out." In December 1946, it was announced that the Asia Insurance Company had acquired the site to erect an "ultra modern" building. The former Straits Insurance Building was demolished in 1947.
