= The Malaya Tribune =

Singaporean daily newspaper, 1914–1951

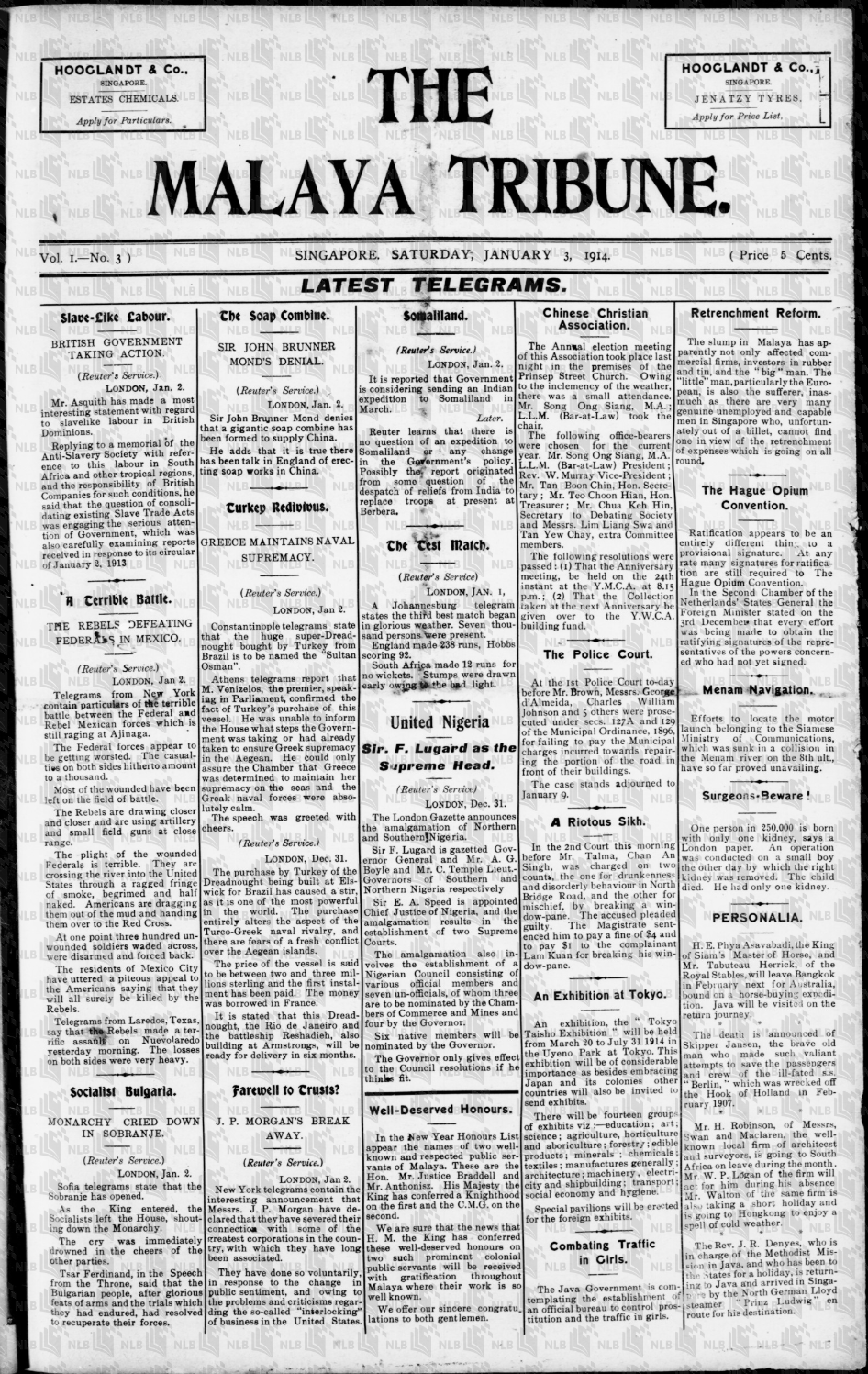
- The Malaya Tribune front page on 3 January 1914, its 3rd ever page of publication.
- Type: Daily newspaper
- Format: Broadsheet
- Founded: 1 January 1914; 112 years ago
- Ceased publication: 31 August 1951; 75 years ago
- Language: English
- Headquarters: Singapore, Straits Settlements
- City: Singapore

The Malaya Tribune was a Singaporean daily English-language newspaper. First published in 1914, it experienced slow growth during the 1910s and 1920s but rose to become the most widely read English daily in Singapore and Malaya by the mid-1930s. At its peak, the newspaper outperformed The Straits Times, which was eventually pressured to halve its subscription fees in response.

The newspaper was primarily aimed at the local Asian readership, and most of its board of directors, journalists and sub-editors were of Asian or Eurasian descent. It was established as a rival to The Straits Times, which was regarded at the time as too Eurocentric, conservative and tailored more towards the British. However, the paper suffered significantly during the Japanese occupation, and the rising costs of raw materials and labour in the post-war years contributed to its closure in 1951.

== History ==
=== Founding ===
Prior to the founding of The Malaya Tribune, there were two English language dailies in Singapore, The Straits Times and The Singapore Free Press. However, the local English-educated population of Asian descent regarded both papers as "European, imperialistic and conservative in outlook." George Edward Bogaars, a Eurasian from Ceylon who ran the Straits Albion Press, a printing firm on Change Alley, with Alex Westerhout, proposed that they establish an English-language daily targeting the local Asian population. Westerhout was receptive to the idea and registered the firm as a limited liability company on 9 October 1913. A board of directors was soon formed, headed by physician and community leader Lim Boon Keng as chairman, with Westerhout serving as the managing director and Bogaars serving as the secretary and the general manager. The other board members were Koh San Hin, A. M. S. Angullia and M. V. Pillai. On 17 October 1913, the board's first meeting was held, during which it was established that the newspaper would "represent the views and interests of the Asian communities" and "uphold their privileges and rights and to defend their interests". It was decided that it would be named the Malaya Tribune. A prospectus was then distributed to potential investors across the region, though this was "met with tepid response". Lee Chim Tuan was also a founding director.

The first issue of the newspaper was published on 1 January 1914 and its release "generated tremendous excitement", with the paper being "heralded immediately" as a "people's paper" and the "voice of the Asiatics". Although its competitors priced each issue at 10 to 25 cents an issue, each issue of the Tribune cost 5 cents, which made the paper more "accessible" to the local Asian community. Additionally, the newspaper was accompanied by a Malay edition, named the Lembaga Melayu, and a short-lived Tamil edition, named the Malaya Valakam. The Lembaga Melayu was then the only Malay newspaper to be published in the Jawi script and its founding editor was Mohamed Eunos bin Abdullah, who had previously served as the founding editor of the Utusan Melayu. It was then printed on two double royal Wharfedale printing machines which printed at a rate of 700 copies an hour, housed in a godown along Collyer Quay which also stored coconut oil owned by the McAlister & Co. trading firm. Typesetting was performed manually and compositors were hired from Chennai, then known as Madras. Alexander W. Still, editor of The Straits Times was "so confident" that the Tribune would "collapse within six months" that he allowed the paper access to the Reuters cable service for $100 a month less than what its competitors paid. The price of newsprint soon rose significantly due to the outbreak of World War I, while other items such as type and machinery became difficult to replace. The following year, much of the staff was mobilised in the 1915 Singapore Mutiny. The business remained successful, however, "partly because of the surge in demand for news during those unstable times." By 1919, the Tribune had gone through multiple editors and its circulation remained at only 1,200. Its low cost led to it being "often dismissed as the kerani's or clerk's paper." In that year, Lim recruited W. Arthur Wilson, formerly of the Free Press, to serve as the editor of the Tribune.

In the 1920s, the press began using Miehle, Linotype and Ludlow machines, which "improved the efficiency of printing and typesetting, and the design of the newspaper." In 1923, Wilson left the paper over "deep dissensions with the directors on policy". In 1925, the Straits Albion Press, was renamed the Malaya Tribune Press Limited. Wilson was persuaded to return as editor in 1928. According to David L. Kenley however, the newspaper continued to struggle with "several years of slow growth and did not begin to acquire a sizeable readership until the early 1930s." In 1932, the printing press was moved to a larger premises on Anson Road. The additional space allowed for larger Duplex printing machines, which produced copies at a rate of 6,500 an hour, thus resulting in "greatly increased productivity". In the same year, the company acquired the Malayan Saturday Post Illustrated. The circulation then reached 4,800, which was "comparable" to that of The Straits Times. Bogaars retired in 1933 and was succeeded as general manager by Edwin Maurice Glover, which marked "beginning of a period of rapid growth for the newspaper." The first issue of The Sunday Tribune, the weekly edition of the tribune which incorporated the Malayan Saturday Post Illustrated and "provided much-needed competition to the Straits Times and its family of newspapers", was published on 21 May 1933. It was distributed "Malaya-wide".

=== Peak ===
By the middle of 1934, The Malaya Tribune had become the "best-selling daily paper in Malaya". Its success was attributed to improvements in its quality, as well as its "competitive" price. According to historian Mary Turnbull, Wilson "succeeded in pushing the circulation up to 9,000." He was succeeded in that year by Henry Lister Hopkin, formerly of The Straits Times, under whom circulation crossed 10,000. In this period, the paper hired Leslie Hoffman and T. S. Khoo, both of whom would later become editors-in-chief of The Straits Times. Turnbull noted that while the Tribune was only 16 pages long, shorter in length than The Straits Times, its remained half as costly as the latter paper, which was "important, especially to the new readership who were beginning to subscribe to English-language newspapers." The first issue of the Tribune's Federated Malay States edition was published in March 1935. It was printed out of the paper's office on 1 Market Street in Kuala Lumpur, the capital of the Federated Malay States. A Perak edition, printed out of 3 Brewster Road in Ipoh, first appeared on 1 October. A morning paper, named The Morning Tribune, which would "not bear the slightest of resemblance to the evening paper", was first published in Singapore and Johor on 1 February 1936. In 1937, the paper claimed a circulation of 13,000, "far in excess" of that of The Straits Times. As a result, The Straits Times was forced to lower its cost to 5 cents an issue in September 1938. From 1937 to 1938, Noel Barber served as the newspaper's editor. The first issue of the Penang edition of the Tribune appeared on 1 November. In 1941, the newspaper claimed a circulation of 16,000 for The Malaya Tribune, 23,200 for The Sunday Tribune and 4,500 for The Morning Tribune.

=== Decline ===
During the Japanese occupation of Malaya, which began in 1941, the newspaper's offices in Kuala Lumpur and Ipoh were taken over and used by the Japanese while the Singapore office had been "destroyed" in the Battle of Singapore. Following the end of the occupation in 1945, the offices in Kuala Lumpur and Penang had been "stripped of equipment", although the Penang office remained "relatively untouched." This meant that the newspaper had to "start virtually from scratch" and its previous financial backers were "not interested in investing more money in the paper." After the paper had gained new financial backers, The Malaya Tribune and The Sunday Tribune reappeared on 15 October 1945. The revived paper claimed to be in favour of "ultimate self-government" and "political unification" for Malaya, as well equal treatment and opportunities to people "irrespective of colour or creed" and for a "better standard of working and living conditions for the labourer."The Morning Tribune reappeared on 30 April 1946. However, the Tribune "never achieved the standing which it enjoyed before the war." Turnbull stated that reopening the offices in Kuala Lumpur, Penang and Ipoh "proved to be a costly mistake." The newspaper suffered from the increases in the costs of labour, as well as the costs of the raw materials necessary for printing. It also suffered from the "stress of post-war competition." The paper now "could not afford to pay good wages, so that it lost its staff." The final issue of The Malaya Tribune was published on 31 January 1951 and Malaya Tribune Press Limited went into liquidation in 1956. The newspaper's former premises on Anson Road briefly housed The Straits Times.

Mark Ravinder Frost and Yu-Mei Balasingamchow wrote that the readers of the Tribune largely "belonged to a gentlemanly, clubby, heavily Europeanised world that was perhaps the most benign legacy of British colonialism." Claire Lowrie and Lauren Samuelsson argued that it "provided a platform through which middle-class Malays, Chinese, Indians and Eurasians could engage in cross-cultural debate on matters that they considered important." Only those of Asian or Eurasian descent were allowed to sit on the board of directors. Journalists and sub-editors of Asian descent were "groomed for top positions in the paper", then a "radical aim". Directors included Ong Boon Tat, Ong Tiang Wee, Yeo Hock Hoe, Tan Cheng Lock, Ezra Aaron Elias, S. Q. Wong, Loke Wan Tho, Khoo Teik Ee and I. A. Elias. Notable journalists who worked for the Tribune included Sit Yin Fong and S. Rajaratnam, who began his career as a journalist at the Tribune as a "cub reporter". Letters from readers published in the Tribune facilitated debates on topics such as the nature of nationhood, with Chinese and Indian readers questioning the "factors contributing to nationhood by using their own situation as Chinese or Indians in a foreign land to examine the assumptions of nationalisms from China and India." Chua Ai Lin stated: "Perhaps because the Malaya Tribune ceased publication in 1951, in contrast to the dominant status of the Straits Times in Singapore today, little scholarly research has made use of the Tribune, resulting in a historiography that ironically overlooks the voice of the educated classes and Asian elites in twentieth-century colonial Singapore."

== Women's Corner ==
In November 1930, the newspaper introduced a weekly column titled the Women's Corner, featuring discussion on topics such as "married life, gender relations, the nature of love, fashion, the status of women and household tips." It was the first local English-language newspaper to provide a "regular outlet for women's views." This was followed by the Boys' Corner in December 1930 and the Girls' Corner in May 1931. In spite of its name, letters from men which "dealt with topics that involved women or were considered part of the female domain of personal relationships and the home, as opposed to the ‘serious’ subject matter of the main readers’ correspondence pages" were also published in the Women's Corner. The letters featured in the Women's Corner, often published pseudonymously, were "mostly written by "English-educated Straits Chinese men and women". It was "not uncommon" for Malayan husbands to "encourage" their wives to read the column. The Boys' Corner was dedicated primarily to topics relating to education and hobbies. Chua states that the Women's Corner is "one of the only direct sources we have for local women's voices from the period", as well as an "excellent source to shed light on gender relations" due to the choice to include letters written by both men and women, its "interactive" nature and the "overwhelming prominence of letters on this topic." According to Frost and Balasingamchow, local English-educated women would use the column to voice their "demands for freedom to work, dress, fraternise and marry as they pleased." Frost and Balasingamchow argued that these contributions "make clear that when the modern girl in Singapore raised her voice she left an emphatic impression."

== See also ==
- List of newspapers in Singapore
