= 100 Robinson Road =

Building in Singapore

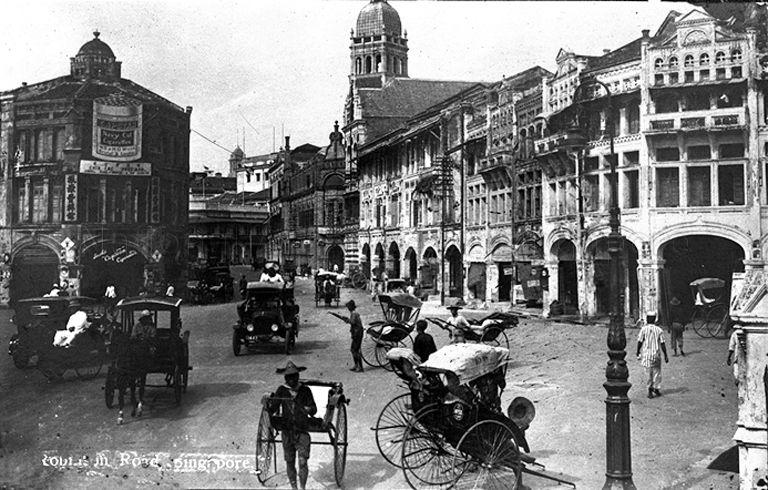
- The junction of Robinson Road and Market Street in Singapore. 100 Robinson Road is slightly visible at the junction of Robinson Road and Telegraph Street (centre), behind and across the street from the Commercial Union Building
- Interactive map of the 100 Robinson Road area

General information
- Location: 100 Robinson Road, Raffles Place, Singapore
- Coordinates: 1.28196°N 103.8511°E
- Opened: mid-1892
- Demolished: end of 1954

100 Robinson Road, initially Printing Office Building and then Fraser & Neave Building, was a building on the corner of Robinson Road and Telegraph Street. Completed in 1892, it served as the premises of the Singapore and Straits Aerated Water Company and the Singapore and Straits Printing Office, ventures of John Fraser and David Chalmers Neave. Both companies were taken over by and consolidated under Fraser and Neave in 1898.

Fraser & Neave vacated the premises in 1903, and from then until 1910 it went largely unoccupied. In late 1910, it was acquired and subsequently renovated to serve as the Singapore Rubber Exchange or the Rubber Exchange Building, which opened in early 1911. The exchange was intended as the "axis" of the local stock exchange business, though this never came to fruition and the building was again vacant by 1921. Tenants in this period included the offices of Tomlinson & Lermit and the Singapore branches of Behn, Meyer & Co. and the Bank of Taiwan.

== Description ==
The "huge" three-storey red brick structure, on the corner of Robinson Road and Telegraph Street, featured Romanesque Revival arcading with onion-domed oriel windows, as well as a steeply-pitched roof accompanied by Dutch gables and "Gothick" finials. There was also a terracotta frieze featuring Jacobean strapwork. Writer Julian Davison felt that architect Archibald Alexander Swan had "played safe" with the building's design.

From late 1911 to early 1912, the building's interior underwent extensive renovations as it was converted into a Rubber Exchange, involving the creation of more office units to be let out, rooms for the public and several godowns. All four entrances on Robinson Road led to the Brokers' Hall, a "spacious stretch of hall" which was to serve as a meeting place for brokers, even those who were not tenants. The hall was attached to an auction room, which featured a podium for salesmen and a small clerk's office. It was next to a refreshment room. The first floor had several offices, each with 24 by 24 ft of floor space and window access, thus allowing for "excellent" lighting and ventilation, and the floor above was "somewhat similar", with the addition of a boardroom. Also built were several godowns intended to link the building to Raffles Quay.

== History ==
The Singapore and Straits Aerated Water Company, founded in 1883 by Scottish businessmen John Fraser and David Chalmers Neave, and the Singapore and Straits Printing Office, another firm of theirs, had grown to such an extent by the 1890s that their initial premises on Collyer Quay and Battery Road had become "rather small for their increasing trade." In April 1891, Fraser acquired six lots of newly reclaimed land comprising 10,330 sqft with the intent of erecting a new premises for both businesses. The lots, bought from the government for $13,739.89, were situated along Robinson Street, which later became Robinson Road, in Telok Ayer. Fraser commissioned Swan, a Scottish surveyor-engineer and architect who had recently begun practising on his own, to design the building. Davison argued that Swan would have been "on familiar terms" with Fraser and Neave as they were all Scotsmen in a "relatively small European community". He notes that this "marked a significant step forward" in Swan's architectural career, being the "first in a line of A-list clients who would regularly return to the practice in the years to come."

Swan's initial plan for the building was a two-storey "markedly Romanesque" structure, though the finalised plans, submitted and approved in December, were three storeys tall instead. It was to be one of several "large and stately-looking offices" being built in the Telok Ayer area in the early 1890s, alongside the Hongkong and Shanghai Bank Building, the planned Singapore Insurance Company Building which became Gresham House, the Straits Insurance Building, the Singapore Land Block, and the Eastern Extension Telegraph Building. It was also among the first to be erected along the recently reclaimed Raffles Quay waterfront. The building was completed in mid-1892 and the offices of both the Singapore and Straits Aerated Water Company and the Singapore and Straits Printing Office moved in on 11 August. In 1898, the public company Fraser & Neave Ltd. was formed and took over both the water and printing businesses. Fraser & Neave vacated the property on 4 May 1903, with the Aerated Water Department shifting to a factory on Anson Road and the main offices moving to nearby Raffles Quay.

Following the removal of Fraser & Neave, the property remained vacant for over four years, being advertised as an "immediate entry new and substantial godown and office" with "moderate" rent and which could be leased out in part. The Schweiger Import and Export Company announced that it was to move its offices into the building from 2 September 1907. However, the property continued to be advertised as "to be let".

=== Rubber Exchange ===
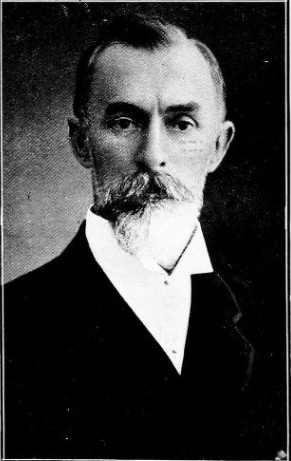
Samuel Tomlinson, the manager of the Rubber Exchange venture.

In November 1910, the Singapore Chamber of Commerce formed a subcommittee to deliberate the establishment of a local Rubber Exchange similar to the Tea Exchange of Colombo, with The Straits Times having "urged action on the matter" for over a year by then. At the end of the month, it was announced that the "handsome" former Fraser & Neave Building had been acquired for this purpose. The Straits Times opined that the site was "most convenient" and that it was "singularly fortunate to have a building so well adopted to the purpose." It was then believed that the ground floor could serve as an "excellent promenade for brokers", with storerooms and meeting rooms. The rooms on the upper floors were to be leased out as offices. The manager of the exchange was Samuel Tomlinson, the former Municipal Engineer and an architect then in partnership with Alfred William Lermit. Tomlinson & Lermit worked on the "very extensive alterations" which had to be made to the building's interior. In December, as the building was to be let out in flats, he appeared before the Municipal Commission proposing that the property's valuation be "amended so that if a proportion of the premises were occupied no assessment should have to be paid for the vacant parts." Tomlinson & Lermit moved their offices into a unit on the second floor in that month.

The Singapore Rubber Exchange opened by February. There was a Broker's Hall allowed for brokers to discuss freely "without the adjuration of a Sikh policeman to move on". Brokers had to pay a "small fee" to enter the hall, and it was argued that this would give the premises a "sort of bona-fides." The auction room was to be used for "property of all kinds", household, real estate and scrip in addition to rubber. By the end of the month, Tomlinson had already arranged for a series of auctions to take place. Tomlinson proposed that the top floor house a Broker's Association, an idea which was "often talked about" but "had not yet come to reality." By then, several of the first floor offices had already been "engaged". The Straits Times felt that the building "must surely strike an outsider as being a strong inducement to the brokers of Singapore to centralise themselves and thus facilitate business." Given the building's "central" location, it was expected that it would likely come to be a "generally recognized place for the transaction of rubber dealings, both in the raw materials and in shares." The Straits Times proclaimed that if the building "comes near to fulfilling the intentions and expectations of the promoters", it would "undoubtedly become a feature, more correctly the axis, of stock exchange business in Singapore."

The Engineering Department of the local branch of Behn, Meyer & Co. moved into the ground floor in October 1911 as their former premises at 7 Collyer Quay were "found to be too small." The firm's unit was divided into a Motor Garage and an office and showroom. This remained until the company was wound up under the Alien Enemies (Winding up) Ordinance of 1914, introduced with the outbreak of World War I, in January 1915. In September 1912, the Singapore branch of the Japanese-founded Bank of Taiwan was founded in the building. Part of Japan's "economic expansion into South China and the South Seas", it "primarily handled foreign exchange transactions and loans to Japanese rubber planters and businessmen." The Consulate for Portugal in Singapore moved into the building by July 1914. The Bank of Taiwan relocated its offices to the former Chartered Bank Building on Battery Road in June 1916. Eastern Agencies Ltd. moved in the month after and The Commercial Rubber Company, billed as "Rubber Merchants, Auctioneers and Estate Agents", was founded at the bank on 1 September. The building had been vacated by early August 1921.

The Singapore offices of the China Mail Steamship Company were established in the building in October, though this concern wound up by March 1923, leaving the offices vacant once again, though the auction room remained active. In September 1924, the La Insular Cigar and Cigarette Factory, a manila cigar producer, founded its Singapore offices in the building in September, where it remained for about half a decade. The offices of the Kay's Trading Company were housed the building in June 1925. By June 1927, the Singapore offices of the African & Eastern Trade Corporation had moved in. In April 1953, the American International Assurance company announced that they were to erect a skyscraper at the corner of Robinson Road and Telegraph Street. Clearing of the site began at the end of the year.
