= Gresham House =

Building in Singapore

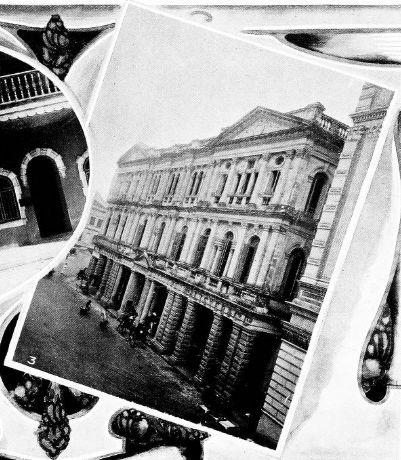
- Gresham House from Twentieth Century Impressions of British Malaya (1908)

General information
- Coordinates: 1.28508°N 103.8523°E
- Year built: 1
- Construction started: End May 1892
- Completed: Mid-1893
- Demolished: Mid-1960s
- Cost: $96,000

Technical details
- Floor count: 3

Design and construction
- Architecture firm: Swan & Maclaren

Gresham House was a historic landmark on Battery Road near the junction with Fullerton Square in Singapore. Completed in 1893, it was initially to serve as the premises of the Singapore Insurance Company, though that firm went into liquidation toward the end of 1892 before the building was ready for occupation.

The building was instead occupied by McAlister & Co., whose previous premises had been razed in a fire. In its first three decades, it had G. R. Lambert & Co., the Singapore Cold Storage Company, architectural partnership Keys & Dowdeswell, several engineers, dentists and the registered offices of several mining and rubber companies as tenants. It eventually came to serve primarily as the head offices of McAlister & Co. The building was demolished in the mid-1960s, alongside two neighbouring historical buildings, to make way for the Straits Trading Building.

== Description ==
The three-storey building was described in Singapore Free Press And Mercantile Advertiser as "being of the Renaissance type", likening it to the nearby and "more ornately treated" Straits Insurance Building, though writer Julian Davison noted that the newspapers of the day often described "any kind of building with a vaguely Classical mien" as 'Renaissance'. Like the Straits Insurance Building, it was also to feature a "symmetrically disposed" façade. The depth at the end closest to Fullerton Square was 29ft 6in. The Mid-Day Herald opined in 1897 that the narrow width of Battery Road resulted in the building being "quite lost where it [was], as its beauties of architecture [were] not seen to advantage." By the late 1900s, there was a verandah way which ran from the building to the Kelly & Walsh Building on Raffles Place.

== History ==
=== Singapore Insurance Company ===
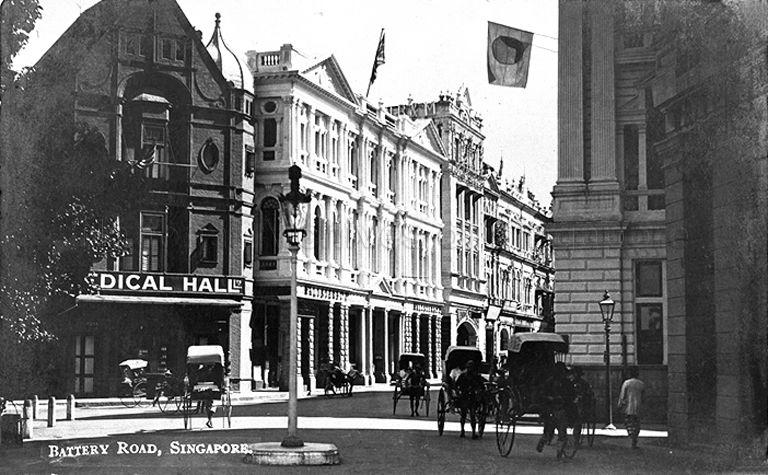
Gresham House (centre) on Battery Road in the 1920s. On either side are the Medical Hall (left) and the Howarth Erskine Building, and directly across the street is the Chartered Bank Building and the barely visible Whiteaway Laidlaw Building.

By May 1892, there were rumours that the Singapore Insurance Company intended to acquire a plot of land to erect a new premises for $50,000, and to spend a similar amount on construction. Later in the month, the firm acquired a plot along Battery Road near Fullerton Square, formerly occupied by the factory of the Straits Aerated Water Company which had removed to newer premises on Robinson Road. The company announced that the new building was to have shops and offices which would be sublet, and that this investment was projected to have an 8% return. The directors considered this a "very satisfactory investment, especially in view of the growing difficulty of placing funds on good projects, and the lower interest by the Banks for money on fixed deposit.

The land had been acquired for $51,000 or around $15 per sqyd, reportedly then the "highest price ever paid" in Singapore. The site was located within the "centre of the commercial quarter of the town" and would "more readily catch the eye of the public" than the firm's previous premises. The Straits Times then noted that this was in spite of the firm doing "contemptibly small business", with the amount spent on the site being "one fourth of the whole premia." Concerns were raised that there might not have been much "advantageous relation" between the rent paid and the interest accrued from the "investment of the sum intended to be expended on the new premises." There were also fears that the company would not be able to handle a "large and extraordinary call" after spending so much on the new building.

The newly-formed partnership between surveyor-engineers and architects Archibald Alexander Swan and J. W. B. Maclaren, Swan & Maclaren, was commissioned to design the building. Clearing of the site began by the end of May, and construction began shortly after. It was to be one of several "large and stately-looking offices" being built in the recently reclaimed Telok Ayer area, alongside the Straits Insurance Building, the Hongkong and Shanghai Bank Building and the Eastern Extension Telegraph Building, the Singapore Land Block, as well as the Fraser & Neave Building which was occupied in part by the new factory of the Straits Aerated Water Company. It was announced in November that the company, severely debt-ridden, was to be liquidated. It was noted that the new building was set to cost the firm $96,000.

=== McAlister & Co. ===
The building was ready for occupation by mid-1893. On 3 July, McAlister & Co. announced that it would occupy the entire ground floor of the building. This was because their previous premises, the McAlister Building just across the street, had been razed in a fire overnight. This was initially to be a temporary arrangement, with the Singapore Insurance Company, then still undergoing liquidation, leasing the entire ground floor to McAlister & Co. on the "express stipulation that no hazardous goods be stored therein." However, McAlister & Co. would remain there, and eventually the building would officially house the firm's head offices. The property was then known as the New Building. In August 1896, the Free Press felt that it was "probably the most handsome building in Singapore as far as architecture went". It was described in Arnold Wright's 1908 Twentieth Century Impressions of British Malaya, as being "amongst the most imposing of the mercantile buildings in Singapore." The Free Press reported in 1909 that "vagrants" had been congregating in the verandah way from the Gresham House to the Kelly & Walsh Building.

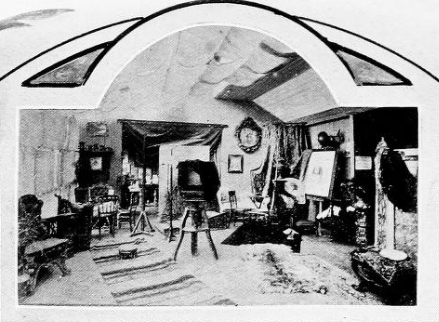
The G. R. Lambert & Co. Studio from Twentieth Century Impressions of British Malaya

Well-known local photographers G. R. Lambert & Co., founded by Gustave Richard Lambert in the 1860s, established a new studio and offices on the first and second floors on 4 September 1893. The premises were open to the public, and some of the firm's "best" types were placed on the walls of the staircase and reception room. The studio, located on the top floor and arranged by manager Alexander Koch, was described in the Singapore Free Press And Mercantile Advertiser as being "cool enough to soothe the nerves of even a photographic patient". The paper further bemoaned the building's lack of a proper name. The firm remained there until 1908. A Mrs. Rooke relocated her women's department store to a floor of the building, which had by then been renamed Gresham House, in November, where she remained for around two years. G. R. Lambert & Co. themselves began letting out 2 offices in the building the month after. Dental surgeon J. F. Teufert moved his practice into the building in May 1894. Another dentist, A. P. Bowes, moved his offices into the building in March 1897. Brokers Latham & Mactaggart, later Latham & Co., opened their offices in the building by March 1902.

The offices of the newly-founded Singapore Cold Storage Company were opened in the building in 1903. The establishment of Camille Malherbe moved into the office above the premises of G. R. Lambert & Co. in November. Dentists W. F. Dunlop and Thomas O. Naughton established offices at the building at the end of 1905 and in September 1909, respectively. James McInnes Sinclair, a commercial agent of the Victoria State Government, opened his agency in the building in June 1906 as part of the government's "great effort to develop the Australian trade in the East". The offices of the architetcural partnership between Percy Hubert Keys and Frank Dowdeswell, Keys & Dowdeswell, had moved into the building by July 1929. After the dissolution of the partnership, the offices went to Keys' practice instead. The Singapore offices of British food preservation company C & E Morton were located there by July. Several engineers moved their practices into the building in the first half of the 1900s, including former Municipal Engineer Samuel Tomlinson in 1901, who styled himself as "civil engineer, surveyor and valuer", as well as contractor and engineer William Dixon Fisher in July 1902 and mechanical and electrical engineer William Webster in April 1904. United Engineers Limited and Howarth, Erskine & Co. had registered offices in Gresham House by November 1913 and December 1914, respectively. The partnership between engineers Jules Brossard and Eugène Mopin, Brossard & Mopin, styled as 'reinforced concrete specialists' had opened a Singapore office in the building by mid-1914, where they remained before relocating to the French Bank Building at Raffles Place in November 1924.

Several mining companies had their registered offices in Gresham House from the 1900s to the first half of the 1920s, including The Sipian Tin Company, the International Tin Company, Pahang Kabang Ltd., the Kadana Gold Mining Company, the Belat Tin Company, the Bersawah Gold Mining Company, the Kechau Gold Mining Company, Bruang Ltd., the Kuantin Tin Mining Company, the Kampar Tin Mining Company, the Selangor River Company, the Ting Kil Tin Mine,, the Sungei Gau Tin Mining Company, and the Royal Johor Tin Mining Company, as well as The South Raub G.M. Syndicate, of which Maclaren was the chairman of the board of directors. Particularly from the 1910s onwards, the registered offices in the building also included a number of rubber production companies, including the Castlewood Rubber Company, Pegoh Ltd., Glenealy Plantations Ltd., Pajam Ltd., Jitra Rubber Estate Ltd., Tambalak Rubber Estates Ltd., Ayer Panas Rubber Estate Ltd., Pantai Ltd., Balgownie Rubber Estates Ltd., Alor Gajah Rubber Estates Ltd., Teluk Anson Rubber Estate Ltd., Craigielea Plantations Ltd., the Clive Rubber Company, and the Port Dickson Rubber Company. This was largely due to Derrick & Co., whose offices were in the building, serving as the secretaries of most of these companies, and these also only remained there until the first half of the 1920s. Johor timber merchant and steam sawmill proprietor Lim Ah Siang was also a tenant. Pharmaceutical manufacturing company Frederick Stearns & Co. opened its Singapore offices at Gresham House by July 1935. The Malayan Coaling Agency had its offices in the building in May 1946. Asia Travel Service relocated their offices into the ground floor on 17 July 1961.

In April 1964, there were rumours that McAlister & Co. had recently completed a joint property deal with City Developments Limited to redevelop the company's "valuable property sites", including Gresham House. By the end of the year, the latter company had become the managers of McAlister & Co. and they then announced that the site comprising Gresham House and the also historic Grafton House, situated behind the next-door Medical Hall along Collyer Quay, was to be cleared to make way for a 14-storey "multi-purpose" block. In March 1965, it was announced that the proposal for the redevelopment of the site to make way for the skyscraper, then named McAlister House, was "still under discussion with the planning department". McAlister & Co. had temporarily moved their head offices to the Guthrie Building on North Boat Quay by June and demolition was to begin shortly. It was announced that a third historical building, the Medical Hall, was also to make way for McAlister House, and that a temporary building was to be erected nearby to house the Medical Hall store and the offices of the Asia Travel Service. The building had almost entirely been demolished by October, save for "a bit of the frontage" on the ground floor occupied by Asia Travel Services. This part was to be pulled down within the next 18 months to make way for a fountain. The skyscraper, renamed the Straits Trading Building, was completed in 1972.
