= Medical Hall =

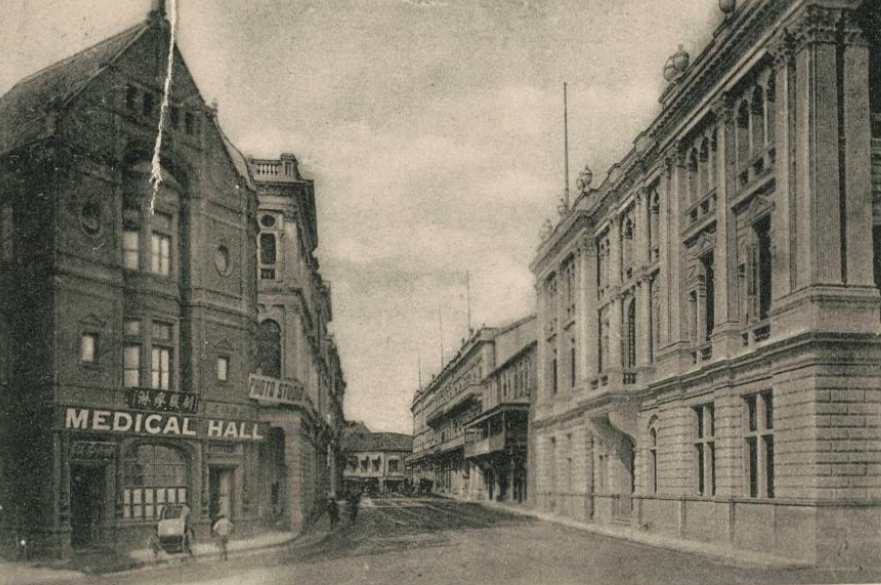
- Medical Hall (left) in 1902. Across the road is the Chartered Bank Building

General information
- Architectural style: Queen Anne Revival style
- Coordinates: 1.28513°N 103.8523°E
- Completed: Early 1890s
- Demolished: 1970
- Owner: Max Wispauer

Technical details
- Material: Red brick

Design and construction
- Architect: Archibald Alexander Swan

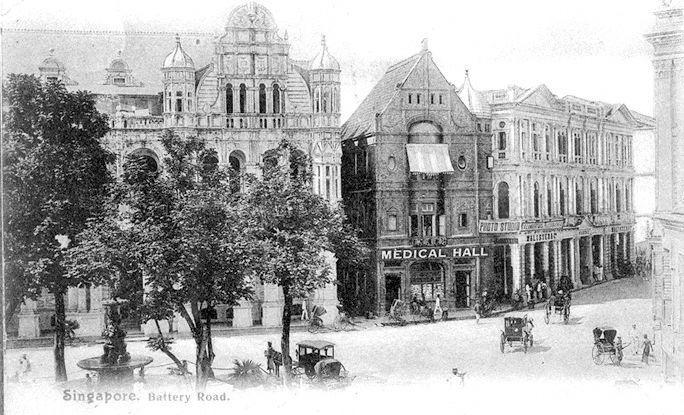
Medical Hall (centre) in the mid-1900s. On its left is the Hongkong and Shanghai Bank Building and to its right is the Gresham House.

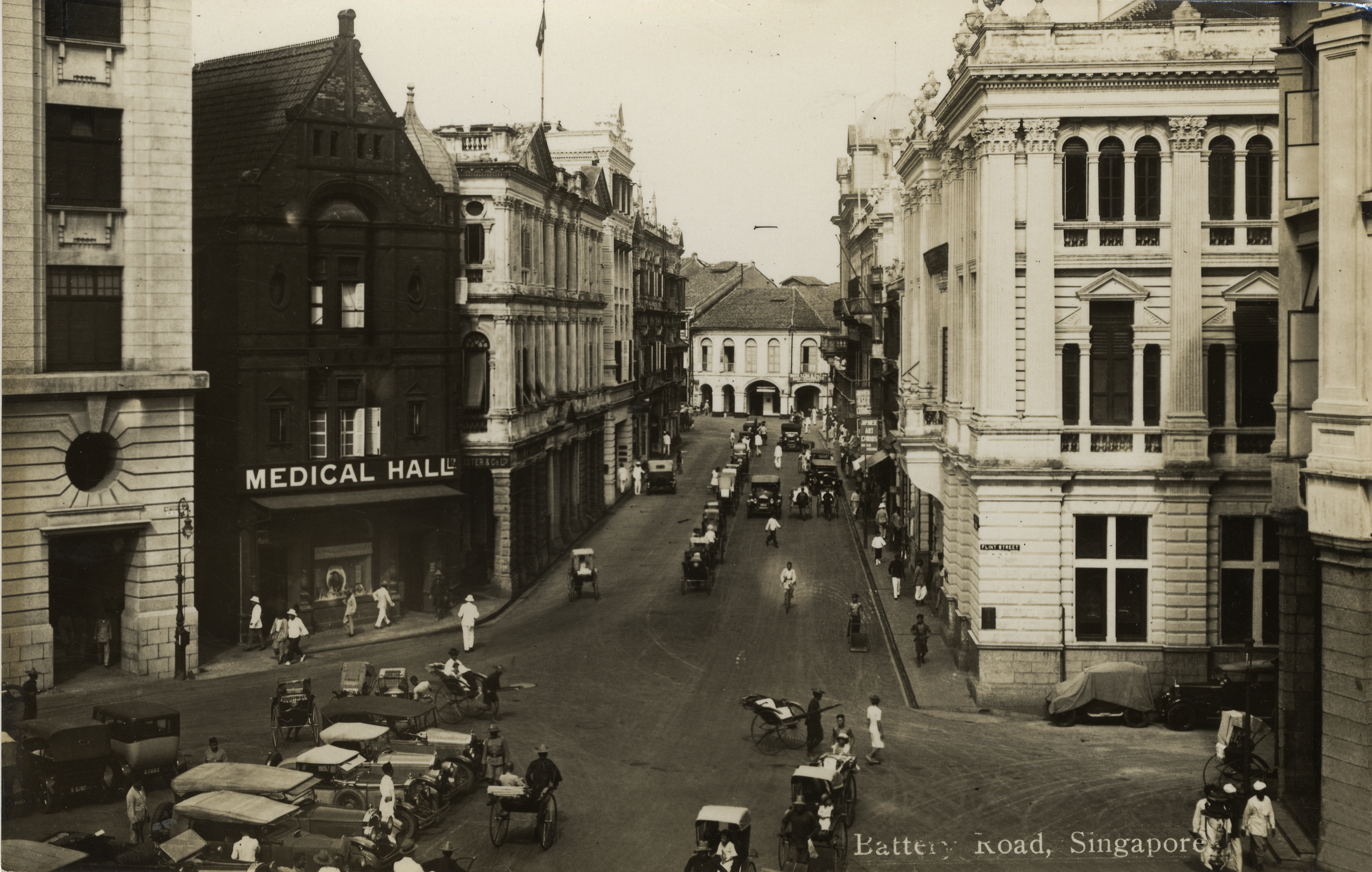
The Medical Hall (left) ca. 1925-1940

The Medical Hall, also known as the Red House, was a building located at the junction of Fullerton Square and Battery Road in Singapore. Completed in the early 1890s, the landmark initially housed the medical house founded by Dr. Christopher Trebing in 1874. It came to be known as the "oldest building along Battery Road" and housed the practice of Benjamin Sheares in its last decade of existence. It was demolished around 1970 to make way for the Straits Trading Building.

== Description ==
The "very singular" building was designed in the Queen Anne Revival style, a rarity for Singapore. It featured a distinctive façade made of red brick, resulting in it being nicknamed the "Red House", as well as a gabled elevation with a steep pitch and a corner turret topped with an onion dome.

== History ==
Architect Archibald Alexander Swan was commissioned by Dr. Christopher Trebing in late 1890 to erect a new premises for his Medical Hall, then "one of the most flourishing businesses of its kind." The practise had been founded in 1874, with Trebing initially operating out of a room at the Hotel de l'Europe. This was Swan's first work as an architect on his own after the dissolution of Swan & Lermit. The building faced onto Fullerton Square and the Tan Kim Seng Fountain, was situated to the left of the Hongkong and Shanghai Bank Building and later across the road from the Chartered Bank Building. Trebing died around a decade after the structure's completion and Dr. Max Wispauer became the proprietor of the Medical Hall in 1894, and by 1899, its former competitor the Medical Office had been acquired by Wispauer and converted into a branch of the Medical Hall. K. Struve and Dr. E. de Vos acquired both properties from Wispauer in April 1903. Another branch was opened in Johor Bahru some time after, and the businesses expanded to include Grafton Laboratories, housed in nearby Grafton House. By 1908, the establishment was recognised as "one of the most fluorishing businesses of its kind". Both the Medical Hall and the Medical Office imported products from the United States, the United Kingdom and Germany, kept a "large assortment of drugs and sanitary requisites" and made prescriptions "of all kinds."

In August 1915, Legislative Councillor Sir Evelyn Ellis proposed that both Medical Hall Ltd. and the Singapore Oil Mills be wound up through the Alien Enemies (Winding Up) Ordinance, introduced with the outbreak of World War I in 1914. Ellis accused Struve, a naturalised British subject, of being "an imitation Britisher" and "a German at heart", and that the Medical Hall was "being carried on purely in German interests", though he later withdrew this motion. The British Colonial Secretariat ordered on 19 February that all "enemy firms" be wound up and Medical Hall Ltd. was liquidated on 22 February. Both properties were taken over by the Custodian of Enemy Property, who auctioned them off on 15 April 1918 to George W. Crawford and Dr. A.P. Lena van Rijn. Opticians N. Lazarus established its Singapore branch in the building by June 1921 to cater towards the "long felt want" in Singapore for "high class, rapid optical services", with several employees being transferred over from its Shanghai branch. The month after, Dr. Malcolm John Rattray took over van Rijn's position and Dr. J. S. Sloper joined as a partner from the start of the following year. The Medical Hall had also become known for selling perfume by 1934.

Optometrists and opticians M. Ezekiel & Sons moved into the upper floors of the building by November 1946. In 1952, the landlord Rebecca Meyers applied in February 1925 to raise the rent of the Medical Hall from $875 to $1,700 a month, which was based on the $275,000 capital value ascribed to the property by former Commissioner of Lands C.W.A Sennett. The Medical Hall objected to this on the grounds that the capital value was "not the determining factor in fixing what is known as a just and proper rent" and that fixing the rent on its capital value would "[create] a dangerous precedent" due to the "inflated" state of the market. It was further noted that the Medical Hall had previously spent $8,655 on renovations and that Meyers had previously offer 10-year leases to the Medical Hall twice, the first setting rent at just $1,250 a month and the second at $1,100. The Singapore Rent Conciliation Board fixed the rent at $1,000 a month in March. McAlister & Co. Ltd acquired both Medical Hall Ltd. and Grafton Laboratories in 1958. In the 1961, obstetrician and gynaecologist Benjamin Sheares, who would be elected President of Singapore shortly after the building's demolition, opened a private clinic on the upper floors of the building, which was then reputed to be the "oldest building along Battery Road."

In June 1965, it was announced that the Medical Hall, alongside the neighbouring historic buildings Gresham House and Grafton House, was to be demolished to make way for an 18-storey skyscraper to be known as McAlister House. A smaller temporary structure was to be built in front of the skyscraper to house Medical Ltd. and the Asia Travel Service before the skyscraper's completion. Both Gresham House and Grafton House had been demolished by October, though the Medical Hall had yet to be vacated. The medical hall itself was awaiting the completion of the temporary structure while McAlister & Co. was still negotiating with Sheares over compensation. Both establishments were then still open for business. The building was demolished around 1970 to make way for the skyscraper, which had been renamed the Straits Trading Building by its completion in 1972.
