= East Asiatic Company Building =

Demolished building in Raffles Place, Singapore

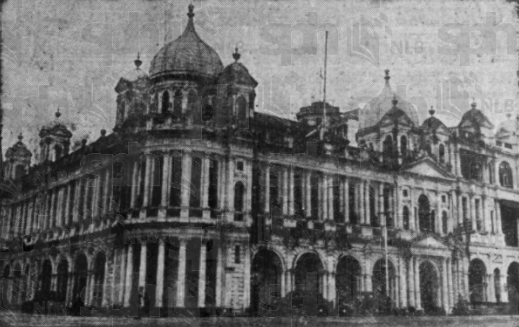
- The East Asiatic Company Building in 1947
- Interactive map of the East Asiatic Company Building area

General information
- Coordinates: 1.28178°N 103.85141°E
- Completed: 1895
- Demolished: 1955

The East Asiatic Company Building was a landmark at the corner of Raffles Quay and Telegraph Street in Singapore. Completed in 1895 as the Eastern Extension Telegraph Building or Telegraph Building, it housed the offices of the Eastern Telegraph Company in Singapore until 1924, when the offices were relocated to Robinson Road. In 1925, the building was acquired and taken over by the East Asiatic Company, serving as that firm's premises until it was demolished in 1955 to make way for Denmark House.

== Description ==
The two-storey structure on the corner of Raffles Quay and Telegraph Street was an "imposing affair". The Raffles Quay elevation faced the waterfront while the Telegraph Street elevation overlooked the Town Market. It featured colonnades of granite columns which curved along the junction with Corinthian capitals on the Telegraph Street front. The ground floor was rusticated, the one above was designed in "Victorian freestyle Classical", and the roof featured two pavilions topped with onion domes. The main entrance on Raffles Quay was accompanied by an "attractive and ornamental porch" with a wide and "hansomely treated" staircase. It was described as a whole in Singapore Free Press And Mercantile Advertiser as being "Reinassance, the treatment of detail being bold, though proceeding more on strictly classical lines, perhaps, than has hitherto been attempted, the object in view having been to secure as much projection and depth, in the absence of a verandah, as would afford coolness and shade." Writer Julian Davison noted that this was "at odds" with the "more Byzantine" onion domes.

The main entrance led to a central hall ornamented with "elaborate mural decorations", which was directly underneath a cupola. The facilities for sending and receiving telegrams were at the other end of the hall. The offices and accompanying waiting rooms of the Superintendent, General Manager and Engineer-in-Chief were to the left, and the messengers' quarters, stationery store, record and tiffin rooms were to the right. The 42 by 57ft instrument room, equipped with eight siphon recorders, was along Raffles Quay. There was also a testing room and terminal board, as well as the lavatories and battery, workshop, store, dynamo and engine rooms, were also on the ground floor. The dynamo and two oil engines supplied the electricity necessary for the building to be "brilliantly lighted" when it was dark out. The domed pavilions, with the finials reaching roughly 80ft above the ground, were intended as "pleasant, airy retreats sacred to nicotine and recreation" with windows looking onto the harbour. Both were accessed through separate staircases, one from the manager's room and the other from the instrument room.

== History ==
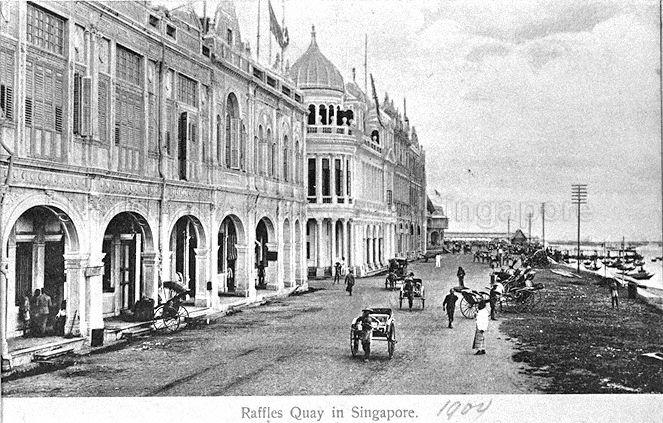
The Eastern Extension Telegraph Building (centre) on Raffles Quay in the 1900s.

The Singapore branch of the Eastern Extension Telegraph Company, which was responsible for the first telephone system on the island, was founded on Prince Street in January 1871. The company initially operated out of a property leased from the Temenggong and later Sultan Abu Bakar of Johor. By 1891, the business had grown "so enormously with the importance of the place" that its premises on Prince Street had become "entirely inadequate", placing its directors under the "urgent necessity of seeking for larger and more suitable premises. In that year, a plot of land on Raffles Quay was acquired from the government for $18,000 with the intent of erecting its own premises. The firm Swan & Maclaren was commissioned to design the structure, with the architect being James Meikle. The building was to be one of several "large and stately-looking offices" being built in the Telok Ayer area, alongside the Hongkong and Shanghai Bank Building, the planned Singapore Insurance Company Building which became Gresham House, the Straits Insurance Building, the Singapore Land Block, and the Fraser & Neave Building. It was also among the first to be erected along the recently-reclaimed Raffles Quay waterfront.

Work on the building, which was initially to be three storeys tall, was to begin in 1892. However, there were concerns raised in the middle of the year for the stability of the area due to several landslides, resulting in the delay of the building's construction. Due to these concerns, it was "found necessary to curtail the designs somewhat." The revised plans were approved in June 1893, and work began soon after, with Swan & Maclaren paying "special attention" to the foundations. Construction began with the placement of an "enormous" slab of concrete reinforced with iron rods running length-wise and diagonally. Powell & Co. supplied some of the furniture. In February 1894, it was proposed that the road which ran from Raffles Quay to Robinson Road along the Telegraph Building and then the Fraser & Neave Building be named Marsdon Road or Telegraph Road. The name Telegraph Street was eventually decided on. The building was officially opened on 24 November. It had already been ready for occupation "for some time", but the company had been unable to relocate their offices "owing to circumstances beyond the Company's control". The Singapore Free Press opined that the building was "well designed, commodious and in every way convenient for the transaction of the Company's business". The Mid-day Herald considered it a "fine and lofty edifice, handsomely ornamented and finished." The Straits Times reported that the offices were "fitted up with the latest improvements and most modern appliances", and that it would be "difficult to find another submarine telegraph office so entirely up-to-date. As part of the "work of equipping Singapore with a wireless installation" a mast was installed on top of the building. The roof was then filled up "for purposes of observation."

By 1920, the firm had grown to such an extent that it had "completely outgrown" the building. A site on the corner of Robinson Road and Japan Street, within an area which was "growing in commercial importance with the years", was selected by August. Work on the structure began in 1922 and it was ready for occupation in 1924, with the firm relocating its offices there on 20 July. On 18 November, the offices of the Singapore branch of the East Asiatic Company, a Danish firm, moved into the building. In the mid-1950s, the company decided to pull down the building to erect a taller structure, the Denmark House, for $2 million. Demolition was already underway by February 1955.
