= Hongkong and Shanghai Bank Building =

Demolished Building in Singapore

Hongkong and Shanghai Bank
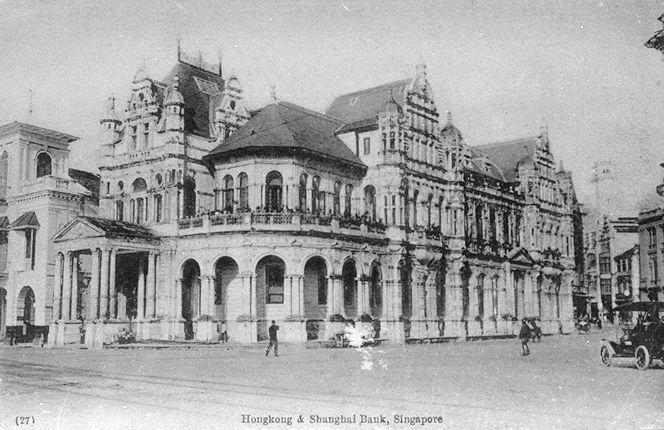
- The Hongkong and Shanghai Bank Building, c. 1915.
- Interactive map of the Hongkong and Shanghai Bank area

General information
- Architectural style: Various (see article)
- Coordinates: 1.28506°N 103.8528°E
- Year built: 2
- Construction started: January 1892
- Completed: 1894
- Opened: 31 October 1894
- Demolished: 1919
- Cost: $100,000
- Owner: Hongkong and Shanghai Banking Corporation

Technical details
- Size: 175 (length) × 75 (height) feet
- Floor count: 3

Design and construction
- Architect: Archibald Alexander Swan (drafted original plans) James Meikle (hypothesised to have added final details)
- Architecture firm: Swan and Maclaren

The Hongkong and Shanghai Bank Building was a landmark at the junction of Battery Road and Collyer Quay in Singapore which housed the Singapore branch of the Hongkong and Shanghai Banking Corporation. Completed in 1894, it has been described as an "architectural tour de force in terms of its polygamous marriage of disparate architectural styles". It was demolished in 1919 to make way for the Hongkong Bank Chambers.

== Description ==
The original plans for the building, submitted in 1891, were for a three-storey block of buildings with a front elevation of 160 ft along Battery Road and then 50ft along Collyer Quay, described as being in "somewhat of a modern style, the object being to combine substantiality with elegance." It was to be over 60ft tall, topped by a dome "after the style usual in the banks at home." There was to be a corner tower overlooking the sea. The public entrance was on Battery Road with a side entrance onto Collyer Quay. The block was to comprise a ground floor, two upper floors and a basement. The ground floor was to house the public house, including the 66 by 40ft cash department. The manager's and assistants' offices were placed in the centre of the building. The upper floors were to serve as a living space, containing in total 11 bedrooms, accompanied by a "large" dining room, a billiard room, a drawing room, bathrooms, storerooms and servants' quarters, among other amenities. The basement was to house lavatories and a fireproof room, in addition to being used for storage. It was to be accessed through two staircases, one for European staff at the back and one for 'Asiatic' staff at the front. The building was to be constructed with fireproof materials "whenever it is possible to do so".

The finalised plans were submitted the year after. Writer Julian Davison described the finalised plans for the building, situated at the corner of Battery Road and Collyer Quay, as "nineteenth-century corporate power-dressing to the max", being a "rich compendium of late Victorian eclecticism", a style which was then "much in vogue" in the United Kingdom. He considered it an "architectural tour de force in terms of its polygamous marriage of disparate architectural styles", bearing elements of the Gothic, Renaissance, Baroque and Queen Anne styles with "lots of quirky additional bits and pieces". Architectural historian Soon-Tzu Speechley described it as a "châteauesque French renaissance revival structure" and an "essay in high Victorian historicism". Elements of the façade included Jacobean pepper pot turrets, saw-toothed roof ridges, a mansard roof and Dutch gables. The Collyer Road entrance, which had become the main entrance, featured a Roman portico accompanied by a pointed roof over the billiard room. The Battery Road entrance had gables and turrets on either side with dormer windows and steeply-pitched roofs. "Spacious verandahs" ran along the entire length of the building. The pediments of columns 5ft and under were made of dressed granite and the rest were made of brick decorated with stucco. The granite was sourced from a quarry on Pulau Ubin. There was also the addition of finials made of copper which were intended as lightning rods in addition to ornamentation. The corner tower was removed. The building had a length of 175ft and a depth of 75ft.

Beyond the main entrance on Collyer Quay was the nearly 40ft-tall two-storey entrance hall. On its left and right were the staircases leading to the upper-floor dormitories and the manager's office, respectively. The hall was situated before the proper bank chambers, which had "ample public space". The cashiers' department featured an 11ft long inlet counter facing the shroff's department and an 80 x 6ft-large teak screen which bore a monogram of the name of the bank made with cast iron grilles. The shroff's department featured a 50ft long teak counter. The floor of the bank was raised by 5ft and the basement was to additionally house treasurers' strongrooms. The upper floors remained the dormitories, with various amenities including the aforementioned billiard room measuring 40 x 24 x 21ft. Corridors measuring 90 x 12ft connected the rooms. These featured arches and ornamental facework. These dormitories were reserved for the European staff. The interior also featured encaustic tiles. The roof was designed such that staff could come up with long chairs to the top of the building to "enjoy the full view of the harbour, along with an excellent view to the westward."

== History ==
The Singapore branch of the Hongkong and Shanghai Bank, previously at 19 Collyer Quay, had expanded to such an extent that a "modern purpose-built facility was deemed necessary." The bank acquired the plot of land at the corner of Battery Road and Collyer Quay opposite the Exchange Building, then occupied by several "old godowns" that housed the premises of A. L. Johnston & Co. and Robinsons & Co., from the estate of John Fraser in September 1890 with the intent of demolishing the older structure and erecting that facility. The site was then reportedly in the "busiest quarter of the town", facing onto not just the Singapore Club but also the General Post Office, the Master Attendant's Office and Tan Kim Seng Fountain with Johnston's Pier to its right. In December, the Municipal Commission accepted a request by the bank to "encroach slightly" on Collyer Quay. In return, the bank gifted the commission a plot of land elsewhere that was greater in area than the land they requested for on Collyer Quay. Engineer and architect Archibald Alexander Swan, then practising on his own, won the commission to design the building in 1891. His original plans were submitted that year, with the bank gaining the approval of the local authorities to begin work on the site in November. The godowns were to be pulled down by the end of the year, and the building was then scheduled for completion in 18 months. Commenting on these original plans, The Straits Times opined that the block would be "probably the greatest" of the "improvements that have been made, and those that are being made, to the structural appearance of the business portion of the town of Singapore."

Construction began in January 1892, though the site remained an "ugly vacant space" for a while. A 10ft wide lane was also built in between the building and the next-door Medical Hall. It was to be one of several "large and stately-looking offices" being built in the Telok Ayer area, alongside the Straits Insurance Building, the planned Singapore Insurance Company Building which became Gresham House, the Eastern Extension Telegraph Building, the Singapore Land Block, and the Fraser & Neave Building. The final plans for the building were submitted in August. By then, Swan had already entered the partnership Swan & Maclaren with his former assistant J. W. B. Maclaren. Davison argued that the finalised design was likely primarily the work of James Meikle, the firm's "leading man" for architecture, though it featured several elements of Swan's work of that period, indicating a "certain amount of collaboration" between the two. The Singapore Free Press And Mercantile Advertiser proclaimed in April, when the foundations had finally been laid, that "in the matter of architectural and structural harmony, the premise will be unequalled — or at all events not surpassed — by the premises of any other firm in Singapore." The weekly edition of The Straits Times opined in October 1893 that the building, then still under construction, would be the "best structure of its kind in the colony", praising its "effective" architectural style. The construction work was carried out by Chee Kow under the supervision of Swan & Maclaren. The offices and the upper floors were furnished by Powell & Co. and John Little & Co. respectively. The iron grilles were supplied by Howarth, Erskine & Co.

After several delays, the building was finally ready for occupation in 1894, with the official opening being on 31 October. Construction ended up costing over $100,000. The Singapore Free Press insisted that the building "[could not] fail to satisfy the educated taste and create an emulative spirit", though it was noted that the final structure "[fell] short" of what was initially planned, though it was still "at once an architectural embellishment to the town and a monument to the public spirit of this well-known bank." The paper noted that the crowd on opening day was "one of the biggest seen for some time in Singapore." Among those in attendance were Governor of the Straits Settlements Sir Charles Mitchell and his wife Lady Eliza Weldon, who were accompanied by Lady Randolph Churchill, as well as Sultan Ibrahim of Johor. The public reportedly considered the structure as "being on a scale commensurate with the business operations of the 'Premiere Bank of the Far East'. The Straits Mail considered it a "worthy vis a vis" to the nearby Chartered Bank Building, also the work of Swan & Maclaren, finding that it was "more ornate" though "less satisfactory in an architectural sense." Speechley considered it an "elegant addition to the streetscape of Victorian-era Singapore" and argued that the banks new premises across British Malaya in this period "provide a barometer for changing architectural tastes". Davison noted that the "Victorian blockbuster" completed the "lineup of waterfront buildings for the 19th century." The Straits Budget noted that, because of its location, the bank would "dominate the commercial town of Singapore" as "no person [could] come into Singapore by any ordinary route without knowing that the Hongkong and Shanghai Bank [was] there."

By the 1910s, the building "already seemed like an architectural dinosaur from another era." Swan & Maclaren were again commissioned by the bank to design a new premises for the bank on the same site. The Hongkong and Shanghai Bank Building was demolished in 1919, after which it was replaced by the Hongkong Bank Chambers, completed in 1924.
