= Finlayson Green =

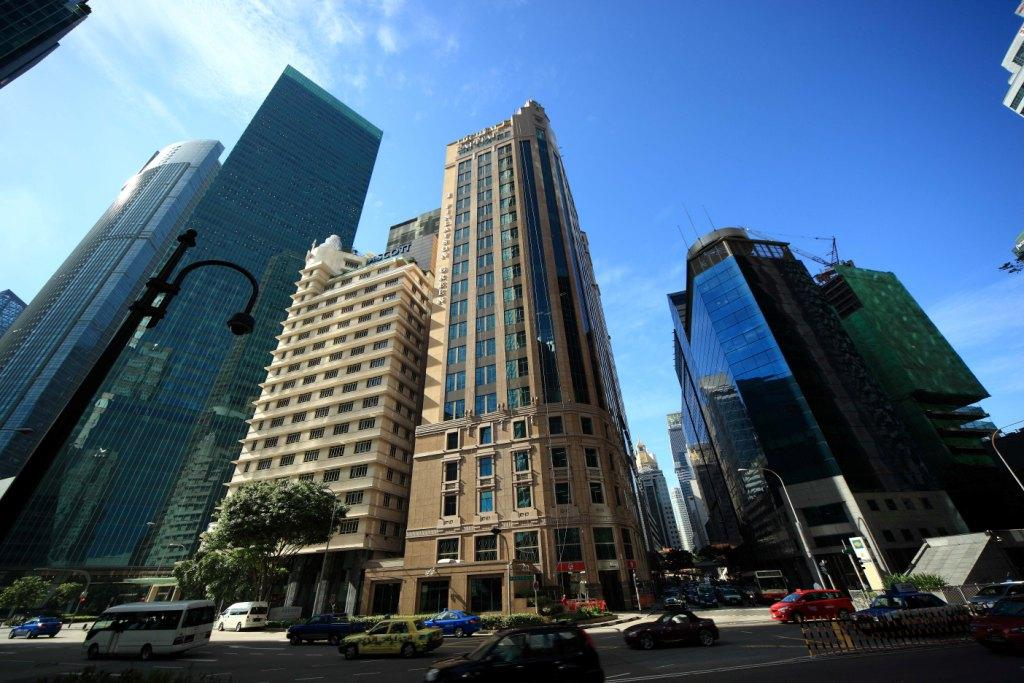
Skyscrapers around Finlayson Green in November 2010

Finlayson Green (Chinese: 芬礼逊埔) is a street and a traffic island in Downtown Core, Singapore, connecting the junctions of Robinson Road, Cecil Street and Collyer Quay and the junctions of Raffles Quay and Marina Boulevard. The traffic island is located between Collyer Quay, Raffles Quay and the street Finlayson Green. It was named after John Finlayson, the Chairman of the Tanjong Pagar Dock Company between 1883 and 1895.

== See also ==
- Raffles Place, a major city square adjacent to the green
