= MacAlister & Company =

Trading company in Singapore

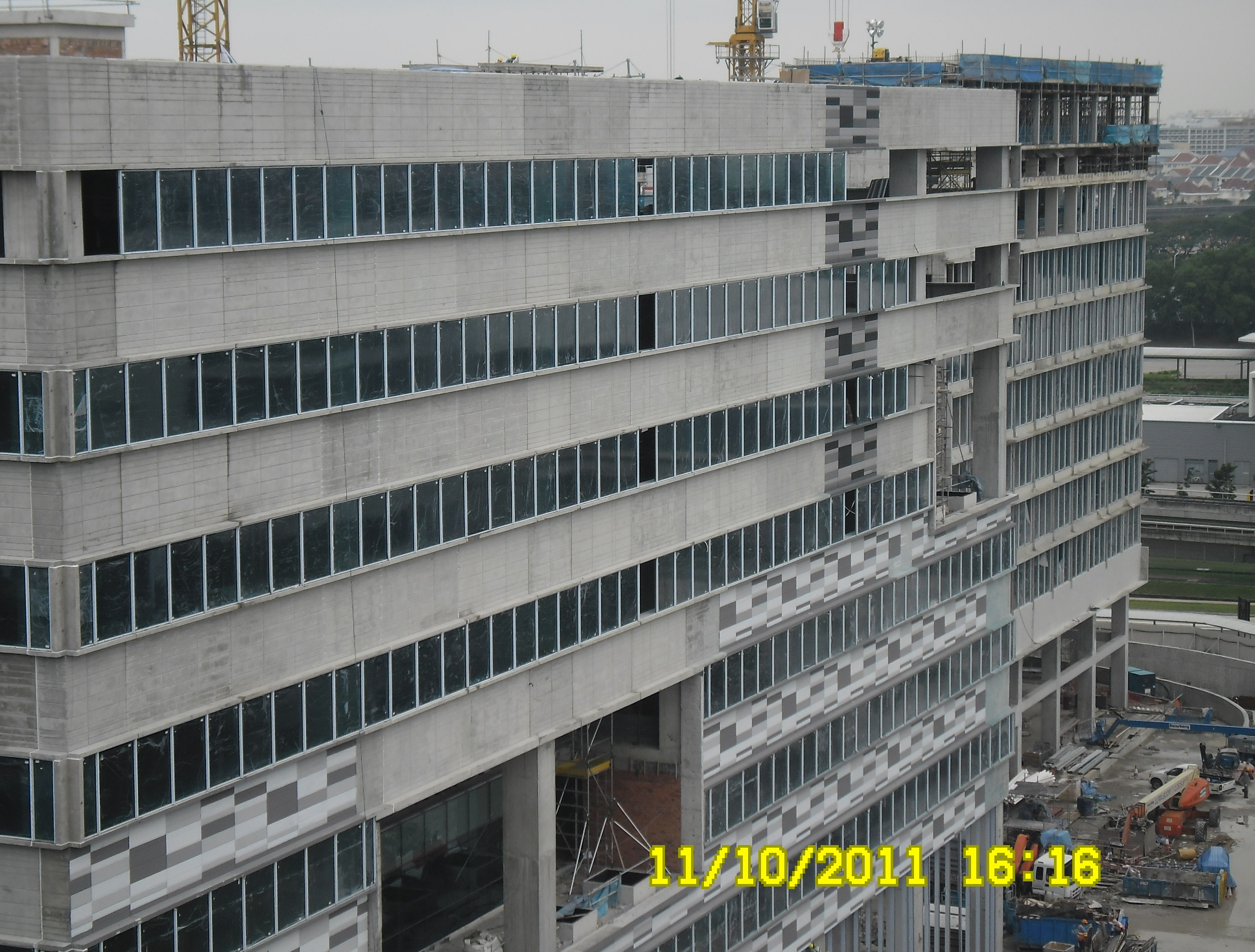
- The current headquarters of MacAlister & Company
- Company type: Subsidiary
- Industry: Trading post Distribution center
- Founded: 1857 in colonial Singapore
- Headquarters: 12 Ang Mo Kio Street 64, Singapore 569088
- Owner: United Engineers Limited

MacAlister & Company is a Singaporean trading house and industrial distributor. it was founded in 1857 by Alexander McAlister and James Parker Niven. It is currently a property of United Engineers Limited.

== Etymology ==
The name of the company is derived from Alexander McAlister, one of the two founders of MacAlister & Company.

== History ==
Two immigrants from Scotland, Alexander McAlister and James Parker Niven, founded MacAlister & Company in 1857, specializing in general trade and Australian pearl trade. Their main office was situated in the Gresham House at Battery Road. Upon its establishment, MacAlister & Company held regular auctions of pearls and pearl shells when Australian ships arrived to port. Ebenezer MacAlister later took over ownership of the firm, with two other businessmen, C.N. Glasser and J.S. Neave, joining the firm as partners in the 1880s.

MacAlister & Company was later incorporated as a limited liability company in 1903, with the larger Mcllwraith, McEacharn & Company Limited becoming a major shareholder. This new development resulted in the improvisation and expansion of the company's shipping, engineering and export facilities. MacAlister & Company also took part in the rubber trade, becoming a producer of tools for the cultivation and planting of rubber trees, while also acting as an agent for shipping, mining, farming and oil companies. By 1906, the company had established branches in Ipoh, Kuala Lumpur, Tongka and Penang, with agents in Australia and England.

After the independence of Singapore, MacAlister & Company specialized in engineering products which included ironworks, boilers, as well as fire extinguishers, while resuming its role as an agent for shipping companies. In 1971, it was acquired by United Engineers Limited. After this development, MacAlister & Company focused on the trade and import of military vehicles, power generators, steel structures, as well as servicing of infrastructural equipment.

== Headquarters ==
The original headquarters of MacAlister & Company was located within the Gresham House at Battery Road. Their current headquarters is located in the United Engineers central business hub, located in Yio Chu Kang.
