= Behn Meyer =

German chemical company

Behn Meyer Holding AG
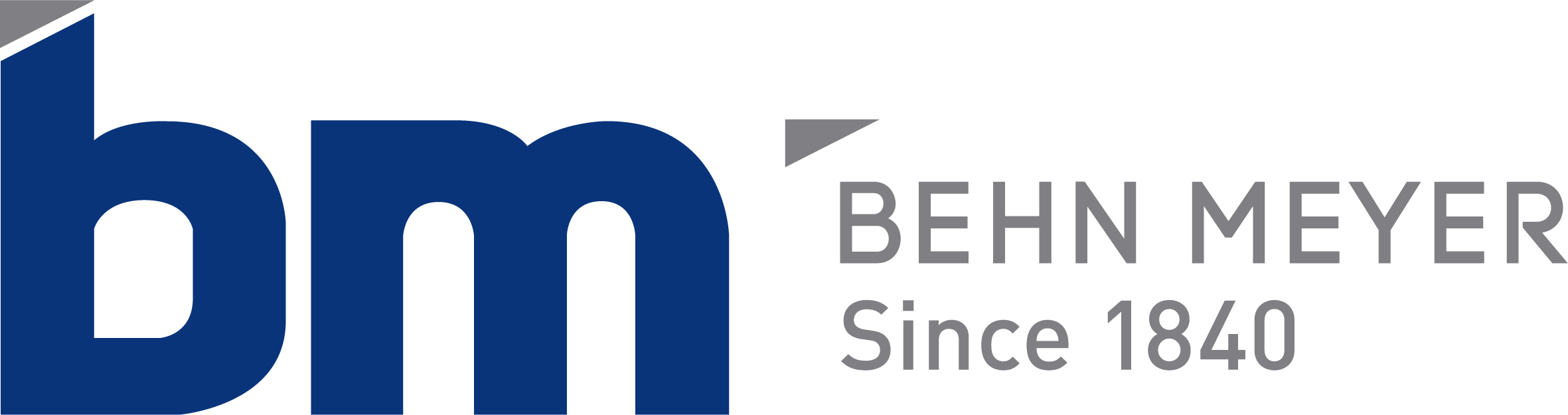

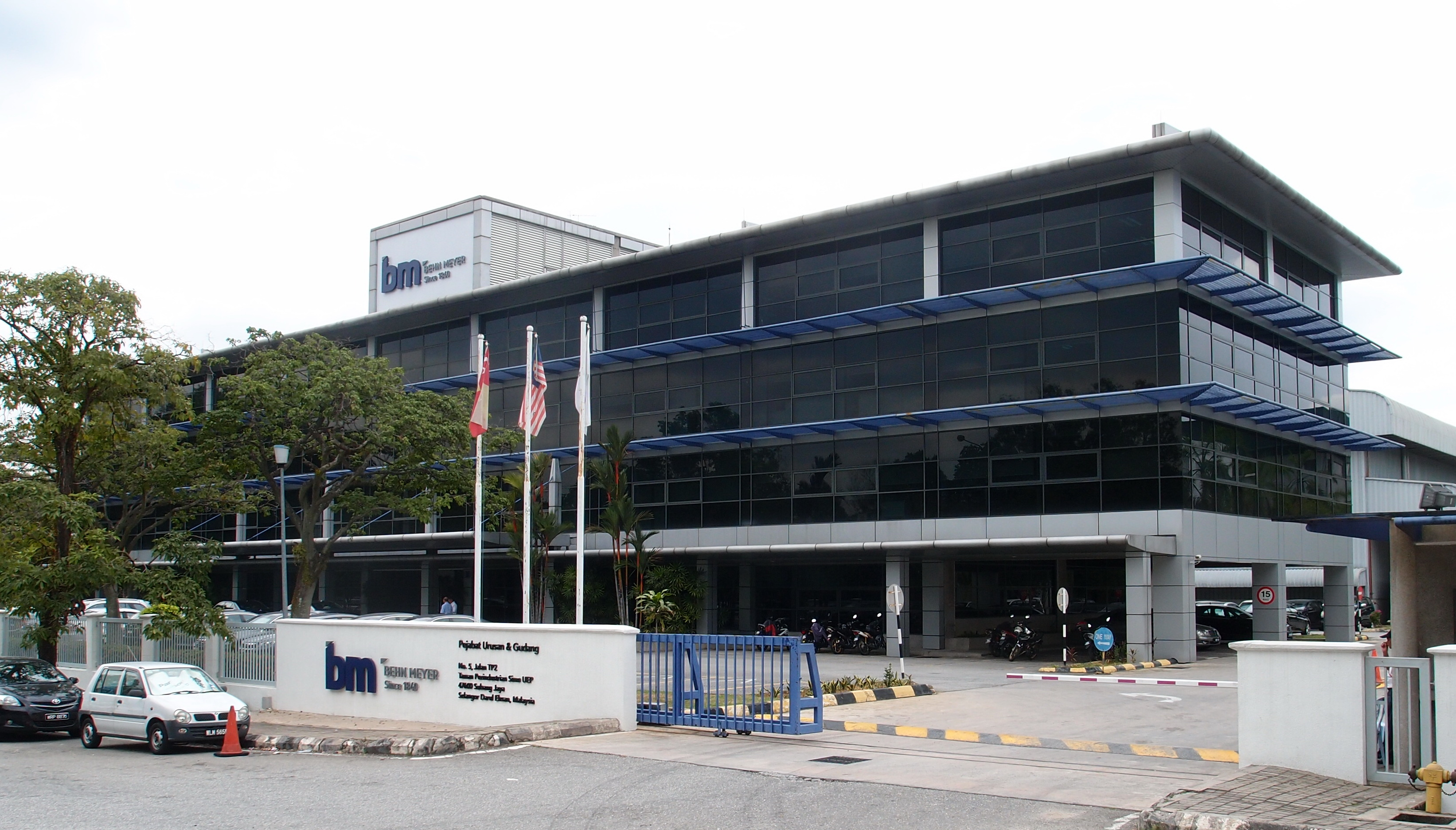
- Behn Meyer facilities in Subang Jaya, Selangor, Malaysia.
- Type: Kommanditgesellschaft
- Industry: Distribution of Speciality chemicals
- Founded: November 1, 1840; 186 years ago
- Founder: Theodor August Behn; Valentin Lorenz Meyer
- Headquarters: Hamburg, Germany
- Revenue: EUR 696.9 million (2016)
- Number of employees: 1200 (2018)
- Website: www.behnmeyer.com

Behn Meyer Holding AG (referred as bm) is a German chemical company and family business that was founded as an overseas trading company in Singapore in 1840, and now develops, manufactures and distributes speciality chemicals. The company headquarters are located in Hamburg and the main focus of its business activities is Southeast Asia. The Group has more than 28 branches, 38 warehouses and several production facilities in more than 14 different countries in Asia, Europe and North America. Its main business activities are divided up into four divisions: AgriCare (fertilisers and crop protection), Ingredients (additives for the food industry, animal feed industry and personal care industry), Performance Chemicals (additives for the chemical industry) and Polymers (additives for the rubber and plastics industry).

== History ==
=== From the beginning to the First World War ===
Theodor August Behn arrived in Singapore on 5 July 1839. He went on to trade on his own account and made the most of the business opportunities provided by the outbreak of the First Opium War. His friend Valentin Lorenz Meyer arrived in Singapore on 1 November 1840, which is considered to be the date on which Behn, Meyer & Co. was founded. The company was the first German trading company in Singapore.

It traded both on behalf of other companies (transactions on a commission basis) and on its own account. Regional products played a major role in its business activities and it also sold European goods in Southeast Asian ports.

In 1848, Valentin Lorenz Meyer left Singapore to move to Hamburg and left the partnership at the end of 1849. He was replaced by his brother, Arnold Otto Meyer, who received a minority share in the company and moved to Singapore. In 1851, Behn, Arnold Otto Meyer and Friedrich Albert Schreiber signed a new partnership agreement. In mid-1852, Behn also returned to Hamburg, where he represented the business interests of the company. On 8 May 1857, Arnold Otto Meyer also arrived in Hamburg and went on to establish the company named after him in the city on 1 June 1857. Just one year later, the consequences of the Panic of 1857 posed an existential threat to the company . Arnold Otto Meyer initially remained in Hamburg and worked to maintain the market liquidity of both companies, Arnold Otto Meyer and Behn, Meyer & Co. In 1862, he returned to Singapore for two years, during which he advanced the company's business activities.

Up until the start of World War I, both companies continued to grow, although for many years, Arnold Otto Meyer did not carry out any business on its own account but instead as an agent, paying agent and purchaser for Behn, Meyer & Co. Nevertheless, in 1906, Arnold Otto Meyer took control of the company Behn, Meyer & Co.

The company expanded in the first one and a half decades of the 20th century and opened offices and branches in many Southeast Asian countries. By 1914, the Group had a total of eleven branches in Southeast Asia and the Far East, including locations in Hong Kong, Canton and Shanghai. Alongside its trading activities, this was also the result of the shipping agencies run by Behn, Meyer & Co. Its other important lines of business were plantation management (participation in the Straits & Sunda Syndicate), insurance and the tin business. When war broke out in 1914, the Group was the largest German trading company in Southeast Asia and also ran the subregion's largest shipping agency.

=== The First World War, the interwar period and the Second World War ===
As a result of the First World War, the company lost buildings and assets that were seized in Singapore, Malaya and the Philippines. Its losses added up to a total of 12 million Reichsmark. Many of its employees were interned and some lost their lives during the war.

In the 1920s, the company was able to re-establish its position in Southeast Asia. The origins of this development were the founding of a company under Dutch law in Amsterdam after the war and its business operations in the Dutch East Indies via the N.V. Straits Java Trading Co. After overcoming its post-war problems, the Group yet again had more than 14 branches in Southeast Asia. It was able to obtain the sole right of representation for well-known companies, working as an agent for organisations such as I.G. Farben, Beiersdorf AG and Ford.

In 1925, Arnold Otto Meyer took over the overseas export trading companies of the Hugo Stinnes Group. This provided the Group with access to the markets in South Africa, South America (Argentina, Colombia and Chile) and in China.

The Great Depression hit the company hard. After the National Socialist seizure of power, the state supported financially suffering overseas trading companies by means of pseudo-investments: investments were not paid (making the state a limited partner) but instead made available in the form of bank discount facilities. In actuality, these instruments acted as state security for high-interest loans. The autarkic policy of the National Socialists continued to have a negative impact on business and the loan burden remained until finally eradicated in 1958/1962.

Aryanization became a main characteristic of National Socialist economic policy. In 1938, Arnold Otto Meyer took over the Tanning Agent division of Blau & Schindler after the Jewish proprietors of the company founded in 1877 were forced to emigrate. Arnold Otto Meyer ″accepted the terms and conditions proposed without hesitation, proceeded with the acquisition of the firm and its employees and opened up a new own division for tanning agents″.

The company's business volume decreased after the start of World War II. Tapping into new markets in the areas seized by the armed forces also failed to change this trend. Attempts to establish the company in Ukraine, for example, were also unable to achieve lasting success. As was the case during the First World War, many of the company's employees were interned overseas. During the bombing of Hamburg, bombs struck the ″Kontorhaus″ buildings along the Alsterdamm street (house numbers 1 and 2) and in Ferdinandstraße (no. 2). Only the offices in the ″Kontorhaus″ building at Alsterdamm 1, known as the Haus Alsterblick, and at Ferdinandstraße 2 could still be used.

=== The 1950s to the end of the 1990s ===
After the end of the war, the company was able to retain its headquarters in Hamburg. All of its overseas possessions were lost. Arnold Otto Meyer initially worked in the scrap trade and the sales and distribution of anti-corrosion paint within the British Zone of Occupation. Given that German companies were excluded from business in Malaya and Singapore for ten years, the company was able to achieve economic recovery thanks to support from a long-standing British business partner, who took care of the business of Behn, Meyer & Co. and the N.V. Straits Java Trading Co. Arnold Otto Meyer also founded a Danish company that was able to initiate business in Indonesia together with A. P. Møller. At the end of the 1950s, Behn, Meyer & Co. was yet again considered to be the leading German trading company in Southeast Asia.

It had vastly expanded its range of goods for export business and was again entrusted with a multitude of agencies. The company also acted as a sales and distribution base and service provider for corresponding customers.

In 1982, 125 years after Arnold Otto Meyer was first founded, more than 100 members of staff worked for the group of companies in Hamburg, accompanied by around 900 employees in Asia, South Africa and the Caribbean. At the time, the Group was able to generate external revenue of nearly one billion DM.

The 1980s and 1990s, posed a number of significant challenges for the group of companies. On the one hand, technical innovations caused certain products and brands to disappear from the market (for example office machines from Olympia). On the other hand, manufacturers or brand owners decided to expand abroad themselves and set up their own sales and distribution companies and/or production facilities. As a result, they no longer required agencies. Furthermore, wholesale and overseas traders became less important given that direct communication between providers and customers became increasingly faster and more transparent.

Imports to Germany and Europe also underwent changes: while the tin business remained extremely profitable until the 1970s, it then declined more and more as customers started to purchase goods directly from manufacturers. The Group additionally abandoned its traditional importation of rubber at the end of the 1990s. Further tropical products met a similar fate.

The company also faced two further problems: The attempts made by the group of companies to establish itself in the engineering business failed to pay off and the importation of canned fruit and vegetables in the 1990s resulted in losses that threatened its very existence.

=== The company since the late 1990s ===
The company decided to take a new approach. It abandoned its activities in technical areas and in the field of engineering, as well as its distribution of goods for end consumers, and instead focused its business activities on chemical products. The fact that the Group already had decades of experience in the chemical trade proved to be beneficial, particularly with regard to its stronger involvement in the importation, sales and distribution of fertilisers, crop protection products and insecticides since the 1960s. Another aspect was that Malaysia and Indonesia had been strongly relying on oil palms since the 1960s and the company was able to offer special fertilisers for these palms, especially Nitrophoska. The company's long-standing cooperation with the FELDA (1980–2009) also boosted its status and reputation in Malaysia. It purchased land in Sandakan (Malaysia) in 1997 and used the site for the construction of a group of buildings for the storage and processing of fertilisers.

In the 1990s, it started to trade in additives for rubber processing and these activities went on to form a basis for the development of its polymer business. The company Performance Additives was founded in Malaysia in 1999 and focuses on the production, sales and distribution of additives for the rubber and plastics industries. The Ingredients division also started to take form, enabling the Group to offer additives for the food industry, for animal nutrition and for cosmetics. The Group additionally established its Performance Chemicals division, which offers a wide range of products for coatings, for the petroleum and petrochemical industry, for leather and textiles and for water purification.

The holding Arnold Otto Meyer changed name in 1999/2000 and has since been known as Behn Meyer Deutschland Holding AG & Co KG. Furthermore, Behn Meyer Holding AG was appointed the managing partner with sole management authorisation (general partner). The aim of these developments was to give the entire company a name that was as consistent as possible. With regard to its operational trading activities in Europe, the Group had already been doing business under the name of Behn Meyer Europe GmbH since 1998.

In 2003, Behn Meyer Europe opened a branch in Amsterdam. In West Malaysia, it purchased a site with an area of 20,000m2 in Pasir Gudang in order to construct a new storage facility and processing plants. In 2010, a research and development centre commenced operations in Subang Jaya. Comparable institutions were also located in Ho Chi Minh City (Vietnam) and in Indonesia and Thailand. In 2011, the Group opened a Filipino subsidiary. At the same time, a new production facility in New Philadelphia, Ohio started to manufacture bitumen-based additives, with customers for these products primarily located in European and Asia-Pacific markets. The Group additionally acquired the Flexsys Group in Termoli (Italy) in 2011. Flexsys was then renamed Performance Additives Italy. At this location on the Adriatic coast, the company manufactured chemicals predominantly aimed at customers in the automotive supplier, rubber and latex industries. As a result of takeovers, the group has had locations in Qingdao, Shanghai and Taipei since 2013. In 2014, Behn Meyer AgriCare opened a production facility in Lahad Datu in East Malaysia/Borneo.

In Myanmar, the Myanmar Agribusiness Public Corporation (MAPCO) and BMM Venture – a joint venture between Behn Meyer AgriCare and Mitsui – agreed to establish and run a joint import, production, sales and distribution company for fertilisers, Agri First, in 2016. The group also acquired shares in Intracare in the Netherlands in 2016. This company, which is based in Veghel, is a specialist for hygiene products and alternatives to antibiotics in animal nutrition.

== Current structures and characteristics ==
=== Organisation ===
The Group's business operations are distributed among different companies in different countries. The company Behn Meyer Holding AG, which is based in Hamburg, is responsible for the overall management of the Group and acts as the general partner of Behn Meyer Deutschland Holding AG & Co KG (based in Hamburg).

The company's focus on the agricultural and chemicals business is reflected in its corresponding holdings: Behn Meyer AgriCare Holding (S) Pte. Ltd. and Behn Meyer Chemicals Holding (S) Pte. Ltd., both of which are based in Singapore. These two holdings act as umbrella companies for most of the Group's operational subsidiaries.

Behn Meyer Europe GmbH mainly operates as a European sales and distribution company for the products of the Group, focusing on the rubber business.

Performance Additives is a subsidiary of the company Behn Meyer Chemicals Holding (S) Pte. Ltd. and works under this name as the part of the Group responsible for the production and marketing of the additives and active ingredients required by the rubber and plastics industries.

=== Joint ventures and shares ===
A joint venture exists with Mitsui. The aim of this joint venture is to work in cooperation with MAPCO to establish a fertiliser business in Myanmar. The company Agri First has been established in order to achieve this objective. The group is also a shareholder of the company Intracare in the Netherlands.

=== Divisions ===
The Group's core business activities are divided up into four divisions:

- AgriCare: This division focuses on the production, marketing, sales and distribution of fertilisers, special fertilisers and crop protection products.
- Ingredients: In the division, the Group offers products and services for the food industry, the animal feed industry, organic farming and the cosmetics, household and pharmaceuticals industry.
- Performance Chemicals: In this division, the group offers products for coatings, process engineering, water purification, petrochemical purposes and for leather and textile production.
- Polymers: This division focuses on various products for the plastics and rubber industries of Asia, Europe and the United States of America.

=== Market position and revenue ===
In its list of the largest chemical distributors in Asia (“Asia Chemical Distribution Leaders”) in 2016, the price reporting agency ICIS ranked the group in 5th place out of a total of 63 distributors assessed. In 2016, the group generated sales of EUR 696.9 million.

=== Locations and customers ===
The Group has companies, branches, production facilities, warehouses or offices in the following countries:

- Asia: China, Indonesia, Malaysia, Myanmar, the Philippines, Singapore, Taiwan, Thailand, Vietnam
- Europe: Germany, Italy, the Netherlands
- North America: United States of America

The Group serves more than 10,000 customers.

=== Management and employees ===
The Board of Directors of Behn Meyer Holding AG has six members. It is supervised by the six members of the Supervisory Board.

The Group has been recruiting executive staff, including women, from its workforce in Asia for many years. This applies to both its operational companies and the executive committees of Behn Meyer Holding AG. The Group has more than 1200 employees.

== Historic buildings ==
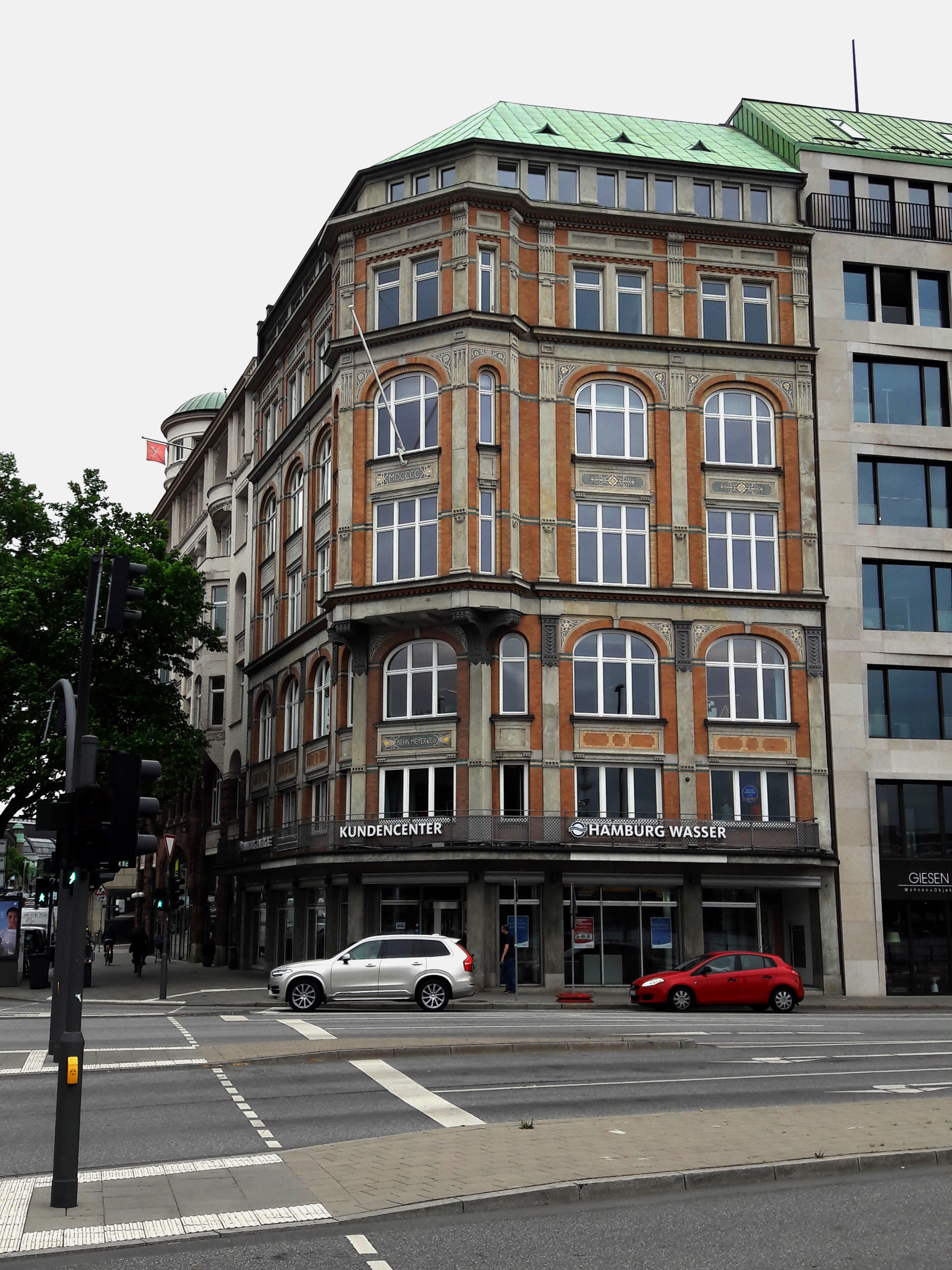
The headquarter (Haus Alsterblick) in Hamburg, photo from 2018

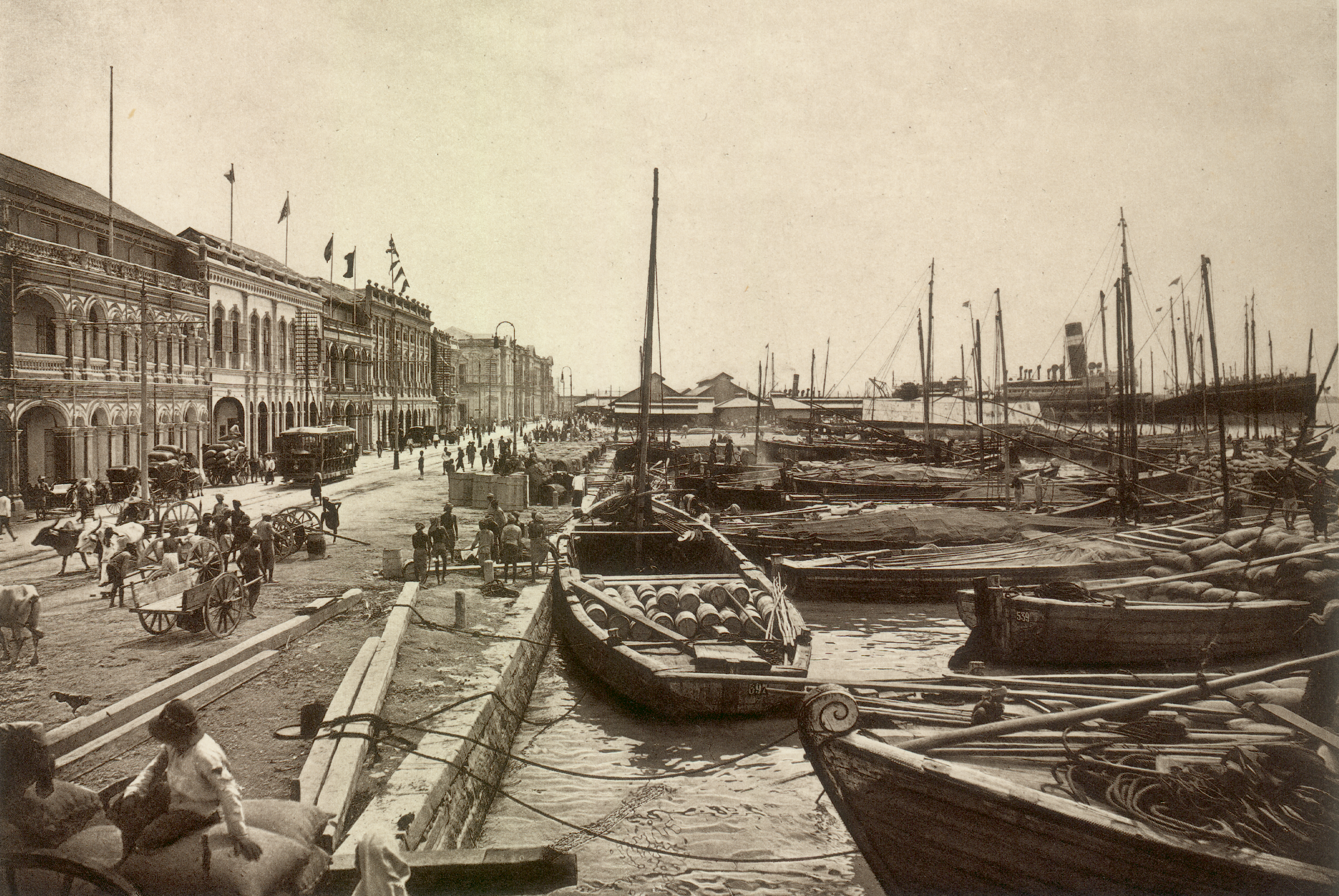
The Weld Quay in George Town (Penang) in the 1910s. The building of Behn, Meyer & Co. is the second on the left.

The Group of Companies Headquarter are based in the Kontorhaus am Ballindamm building (house number 1), on the corner of Glockengießerwall, in Hamburg. It is a five-storey corner building that overlooks the Außenalster and Binnenalster lakes and is located in close proximity to the Lombard Bridge, the Kunsthalle Hamburg and Hamburg Hauptbahnhof central station. The building was planned at the end of the 19th century and completed in 1907. In the Second World War, a bomb destroyed its roof and setback level, both of which were rebuilt in 1959. The building's facade was extensively renovated in two stages between 2002 and 2003. During the renovation work, columns, wrought-iron structures, fluting, cornices, Cotta Sandstone stone work and mosaics were uncovered and restored. In 2005, the restoration work was praised by the Patriotische Gesellschaft von 1765 (Patriotic Society of 1765).

The former building of Behn, Meyer & Co. in Penang is now part of the state's Heritage Trail and houses a museum. Penang was the Group's first location in Malaya in 1891, and its first establishment of a company outside Singapore. It is now the last preserved historic building in the company's history in Asia.

== Corporate social responsibility ==
Donations and corporate behaviour involving social responsibility are long-standing traditions within the company. In 1857, for example, Theodor August Behn donated money to the Sailors Home, Mr. Keasberry's Malay Schools, the Tan Tock Seng Hospital and the Seamen's Hospital in Singapore. On the 50th anniversary of the establishment of Behn, Meyer & Co. in 1890, the company donated a complete set of silver altarware to the Anglican St Andrews Cathedral in Singapore, which is still in use in the cathedral in the present day.

After the Second World War, the proprietors of Arnold Otto Meyer founded a welfare association (Arnold Otto Meyer Fürsorge e. V.) in Hamburg with the aim of using its achievements to help long-standing employees where required. A total of more than 14 million DM was collected from the profits of Arnold Otto Meyer by 1973. The company also built flats for staff in order to relieve the housing shortage in the post-war period.

The Behn Meyer Foundation has existed in Malaysia since 1989 and focuses on providing further education and training for staff and educating the children of employees. The Group also supports selected primary schools in Indonesia and set up a foundation to support Indonesian orphanages in the 1970s. In Vietnam, it provides funding for schools and social facilities for children. In Thailand, the company has been involved in a number of disaster management measures by providing financial donations and helpers. On the occasion of the 175th anniversary of its founding, the company donated 100,000 Singapore dollars to the National University Cancer Institute in Singapore.
