= Change Alley, Singapore =

Coordinates: 1.2841°N 103.8522°E

Change Alley in Hitachi Tower
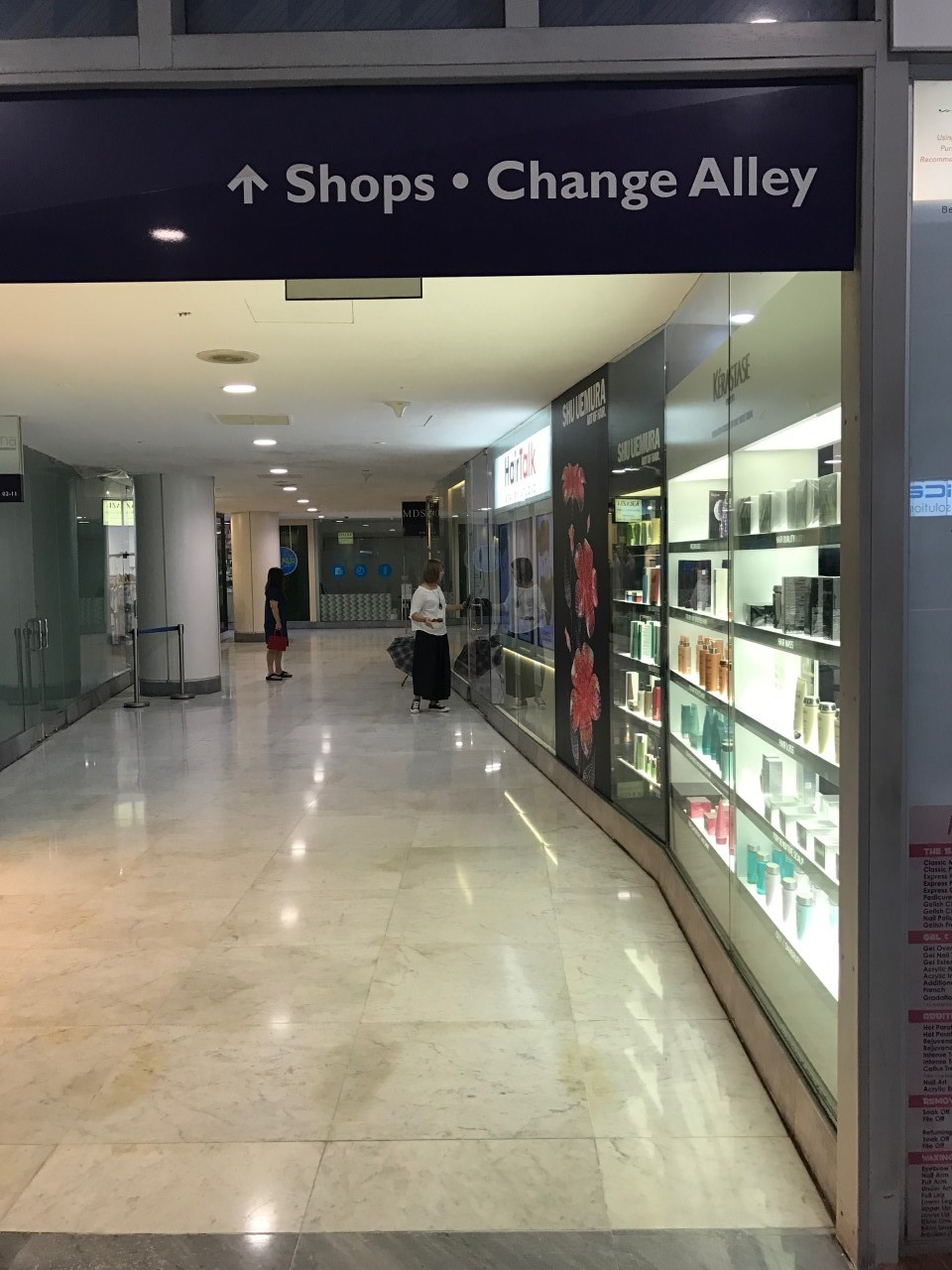
- Entrance to Change Alley in second floor of Hitachi Tower
- Location: Hitachi Tower, Raffles Place, Singapore

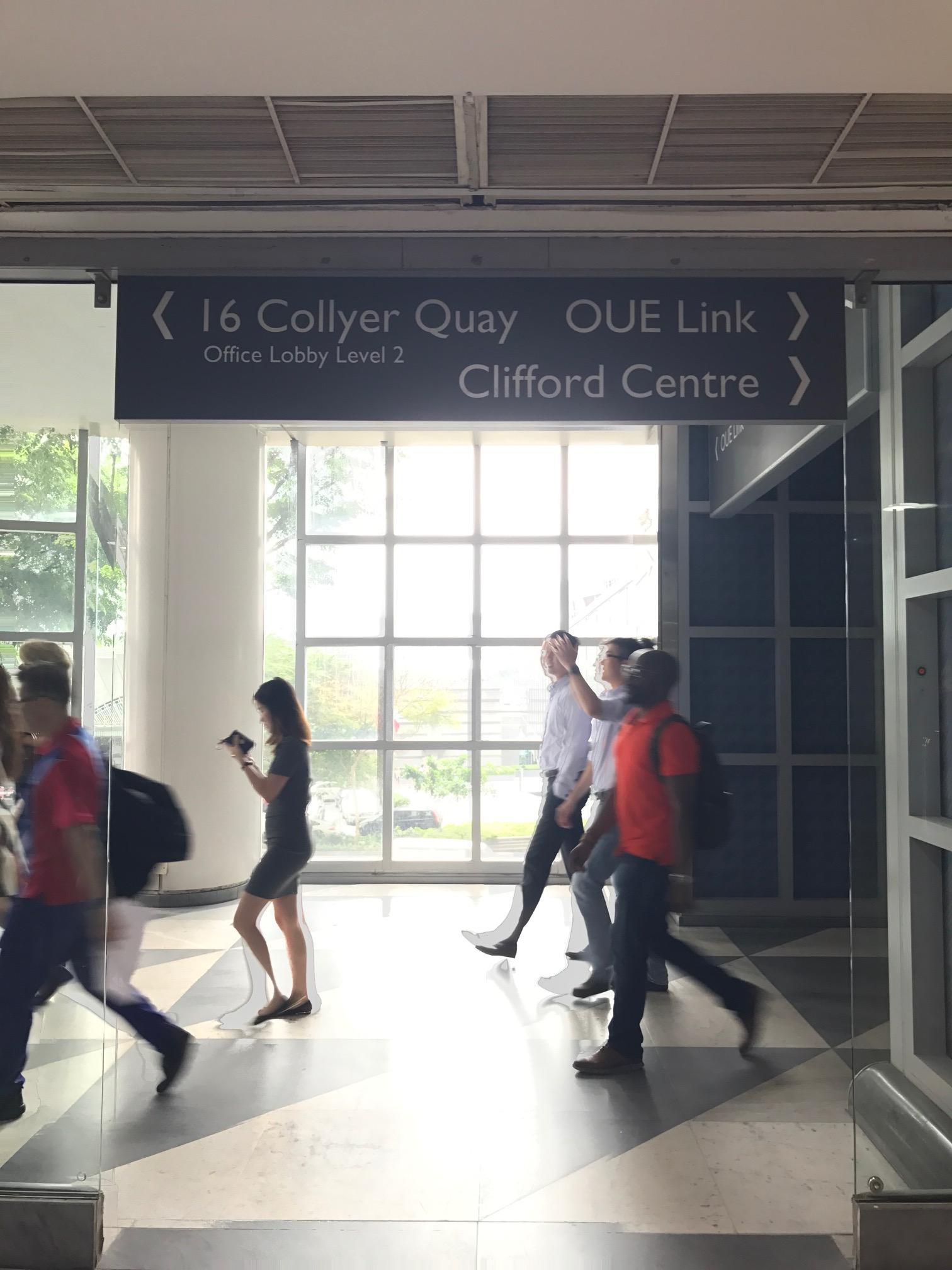
Exit from Change Alley to OUE Link overhead bridge

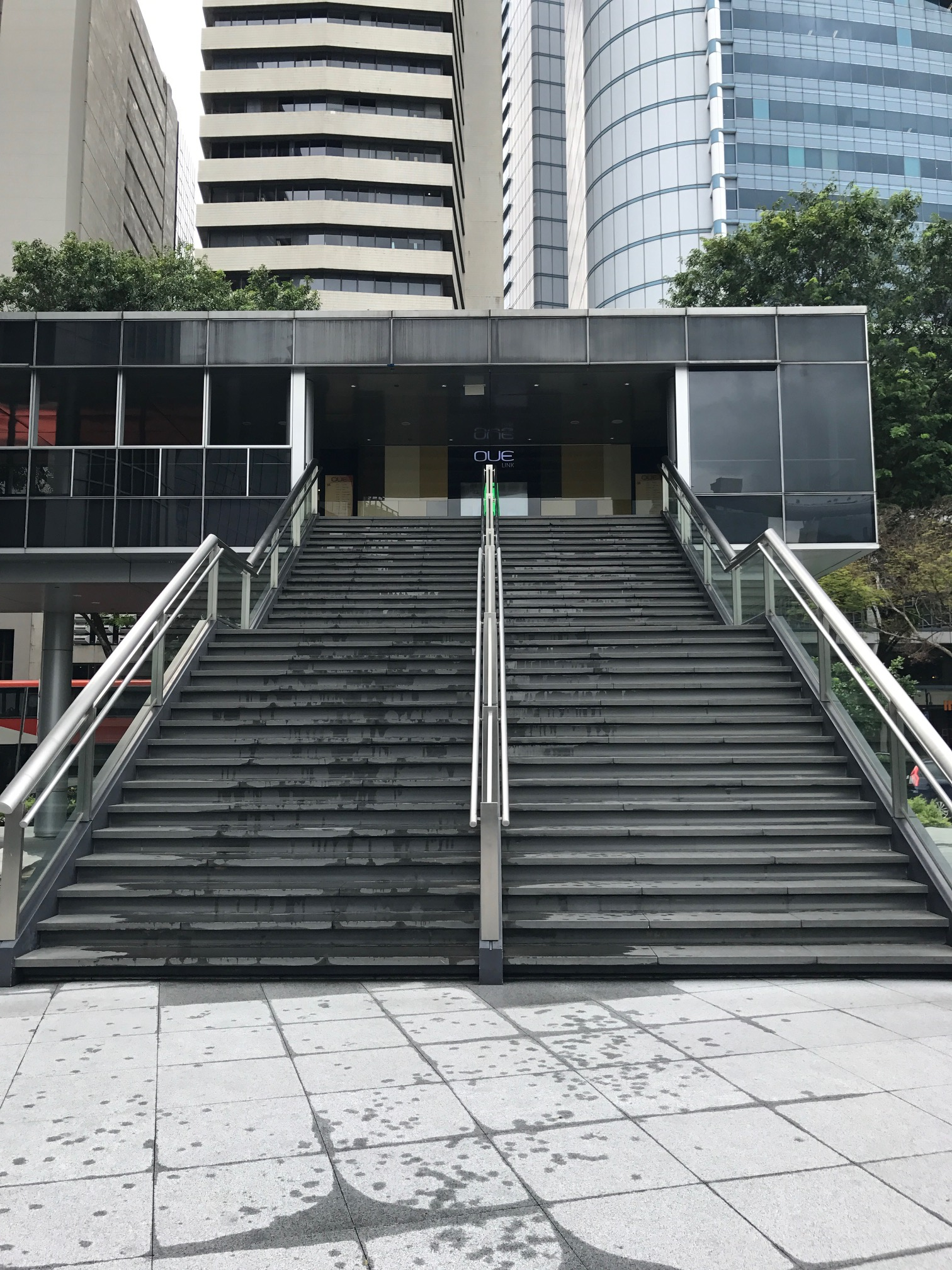
Entrance to OUE Link

Change Alley is an air-conditioned shopping arcade in the financial district of Raffles Place in Downtown Core planning area of Singapore. Flanked by the skyscrapers Chevron House and Hitachi Tower, it is an alley that links Raffles Place and Collyer Quay. It was renovated to what it is today in 1989, replacing the old Change Alley whose history dates back as far as 1819.

== History ==
1819: Owing to the poor geographical location of the beach front stretching from Esplanade to Rochor River as the prior trading site, Raffles shifted the commercial centre to the South Bank of Singapore (today's South Boat Quay), nearer to the mouth of the Singapore River, where waters were less shallow and more accessible.

1822: Raffles Place was designated as the planned business center of SG in Raffles’ Town Plan. However, at that point of time, the area was unoccupied, swampy land cut through with creeks and covered with jungle and mangrove trees. It had to be reclaimed. A small hill at the end of Tanjong Singapura (today's Raffles Place) was levelled to use the soil to fill up the SouthWest bank of Singapore River. Architect George D. Coleman was involved in the land reclamation.

1858: The commercial square was later renamed Raffles Place.

1890: Change Alley acquired its name after a trading hub known as Exchange Alley in London and maybe from the large number of Indian money changers there. It became a place where locals conducted barter trade with regional sea merchants and Europeans.

1905: 4-storey Winchester House was built at the entrance to Change Alley at the Collyer Quay side.

1920s: 5-storey Shell House was built at the start of this decade at the entrance to Change Alley at the Raffles Place, it was later completed in 1960 as a 14-storey office block and renamed Singapore Rubber House. Change Alley was not famous yet but recognized as a meeting place for European buyers and Asian brokers. There were only a few stalls then so it served as a convenient thoroughfare for pedestrians to get from Collyer Quay to Raffles Place.

1930s: The 100-metre long informal space gained reputation for its increasing hustle and bustle. There was the presence of money changers, a thriving market where Chinese dealers traded in gambier, pepper, copra, tin and other types of produce alongside compradors serving the European merchants. It soon became a tourist attraction during this period, for both tourists and sailors who came to Singapore by ship, arriving at Clifford Pier and making their way from the seafront to Raffles Place through this narrow alley.

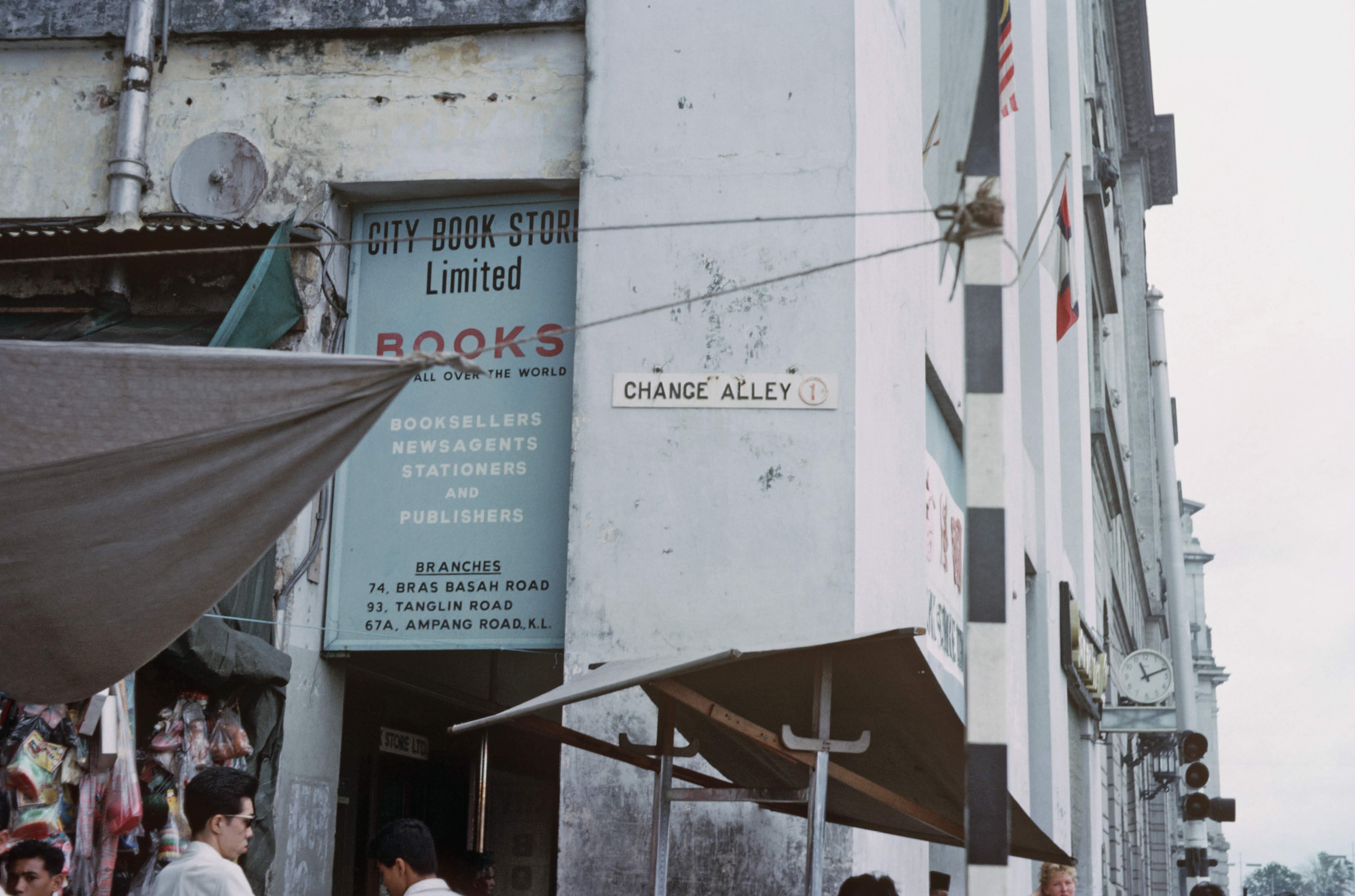
Street sign for Change Alley in 1965

1950s: Owing to the growing number of patrons and sellers, goods and services diversified dramatically. It began to include clothes, briefcases, watches, toys, fishing accessories, handicrafts, souvenirs, tailoring, and shoe polish and cobbler services.

Infrastructure-wise, Change Alley was made up of small shops and makeshift tables, roving salesmen with their wooden boxes containing wares such as pens and watches. Improvised awning for the alley was created using zinc, plastic or canvas sheets that sometimes failed to prevent leaks on rainy days. Change Alley grew even narrower, congested and stuffy.

Shopkeepers could speak phrases in various languages such as French, German, Italian and even Russian to conduct business. Money changers, most of whom were Indians, ran their businesses within their own shops.

1973: Following a revamp of Clifford Pier, Change Alley Aerial Plaza opened on the bridge linking the pier to Change Alley.

1980s: Change Alley saw a dwindling of customers due to a few reasons: Decline in sea travel, competition with modern air-conditioned shopping centers, and withdrawal of foreign troops from Singapore.

April 1989: After a period of bargain sales to clear stocks in April, shops in Change Alley opened for the last time. Affected stallholders were offered the option of renting sundry and cooked-food stalls at markets and food centers. Winchester House and Shell House (also known as Singapore Rubber House) were both demolished after Change Alley cleared out.

1993: Change Alley returned following the completion of Caltex/Chevron House (replaced Singapore Rubber House) in this year and Hitachi Tower (replaced Winchester House) the year before this. The newly revamped Change Alley, which is an air-conditioned shopping arcade flanked by 2 skyscrapers, was established.

== New developments ==
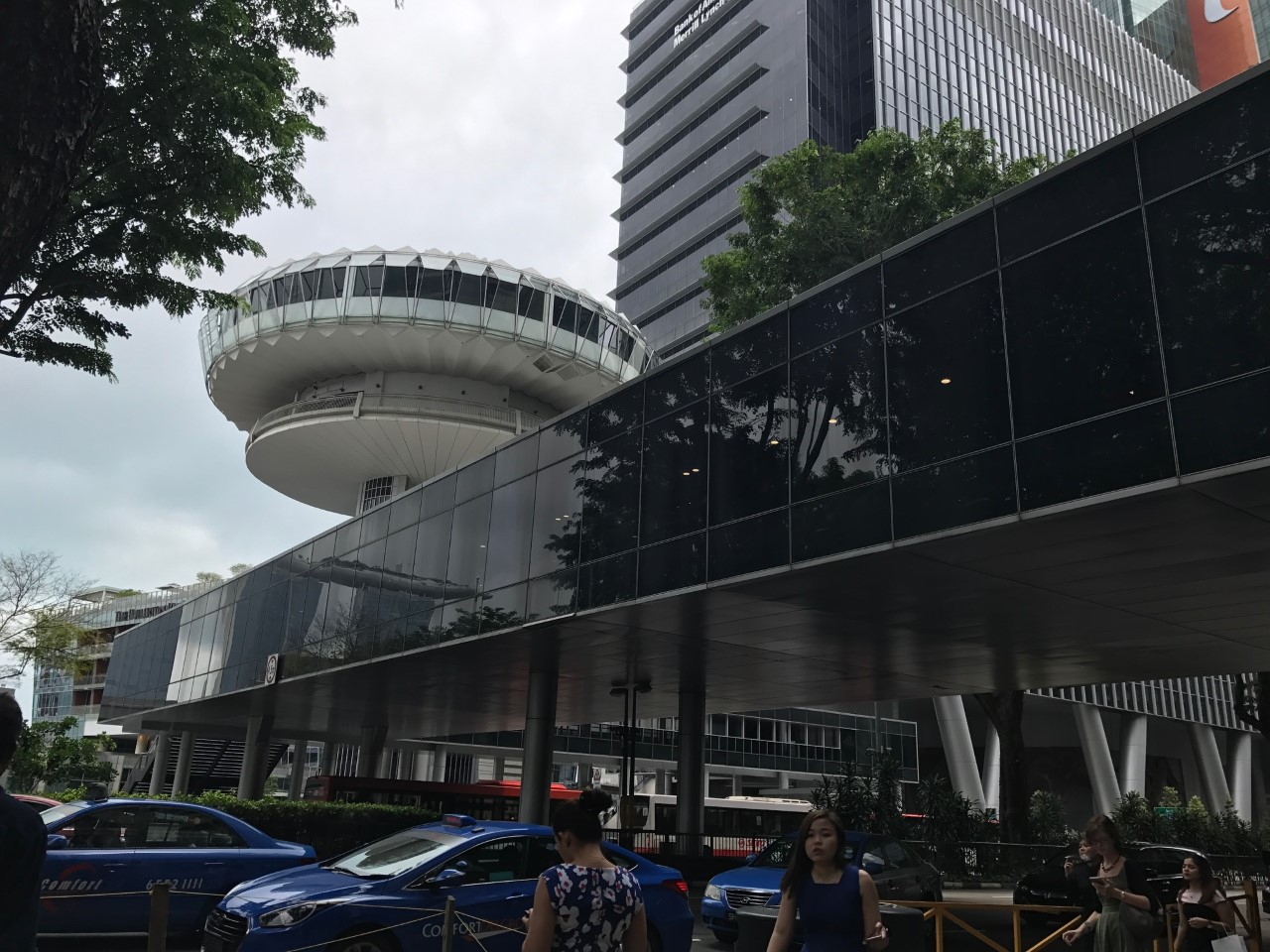
OUE Link, newly revamped Change Alley Aerial Plaza in the background

As of 2017, Change Alley sits in the second floor of Hitachi Tower at 16 Collyer Quay. The short stretch of shops along the lanes in the shape of an 'F' are flanked by salons, tailors, boutique shops that sells shoes and clothes, and a florist. It serves mostly the expatriate workforce and the higher-earning white collar workers in the Central Business District. To locals' knowledge, the area of Change Alley stretches into the overhead bridge, which is known as OUE Link presently. Change Alley has undergone many changes, from a bustling, hot and stuffy narrow lane filled with diverse tenants seeking to earn a buck to a posh and clean shopping lane with a vastly different demographic of tenants and patrons.

== See also ==
- List of shopping malls in Singapore
