= Collyer Quay Centre =

Office skyscraper in Singapore

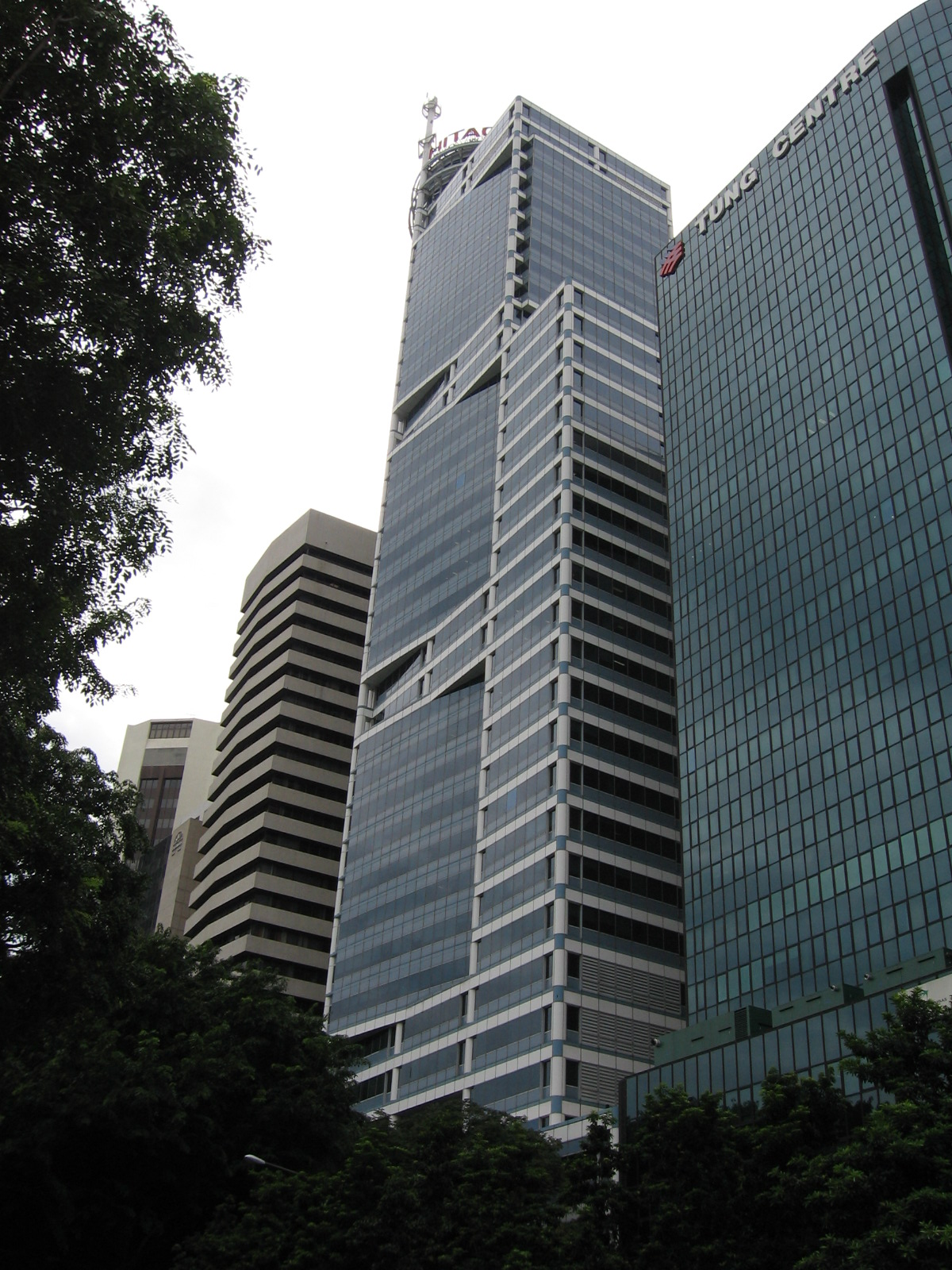
- Collyer Quay Centre, 16 Collyer Quay, with Tung Centre on the right
- Former names: CALTEX HOUSE and Hitachi Tower

General information
- Status: Completed
- Type: Commercial offices
- Architectural style: Modernism
- Location: 16 Collyer Quay, Singapore 049318
- Coordinates: 1°17′03.08″N 103°51′08.72″E
- Cost: $60 million
- Owner: NTUC Income

Height
- Antenna spire: 179 m (587 ft)
- Roof: 166 m (545 ft)

Technical details
- Floor count: 37
- Lifts/elevators: 12

Design and construction
- Architects: Murphy/Jahn, Inc. Architects, Architects 61 Pte Ltd

Collyer Quay Centre, formerly CALTEX HOUSE and Hitachi Tower, is a 37-storey, 166 m (545 ft), skyscraper in the central business district of Singapore. It is located on 16 Collyer Quay, in the zone of Raffles Place, near Chevron House, Change Alley, Tung Centre, and The Arcade, all of which are roughly 100 metres away. Facing Clifford Pier, the building commands a panoramic view of Marina Bay. It has an underground linkage to Raffles Place MRT station.

The skyscraper has a spire that is 13 m (43 ft), which increases the tower overall height from 166 to 179 m (545 to 587 ft) It is on a 999-year leasehold.

Collyer Quay Centre has a net lettable area of approximately 25,980 m^{2} (279,600 sq ft). The building had close to 100% occupancy as of 31 December 2007, and key tenants include Hitachi and American Express.

== History ==
Hitachi Tower was designed by Murphy/Jahn, Inc. Architects, and local firm Architects 61 Pte Ltd. It was completed in 1992. Other firms involved in the development include Hitachi, CapitaLand Commercial Limited, Savu Investments Private Limited, CapitaLand Limited, Obayashi Gumi Corporation, Sendai Eversendai Engineering Group, Steen Consultants Private Limited, PCR Engineers Private Limited, and Rider Hunt Levett & Bailey.

=== Selling of stake ===
On 16 January 2008, CapitaLand sold its 50% stake in Hitachi Tower for S$403.5 million, which it had earlier bought in 2000. The National University of Singapore, which owns the remaining 50% of the office building, also sold its stake. Upon the deal's completion, CapitaLand will recognise a gain of S$110.1 million.

According to CapitaLand, the deal took into consideration the agreed value of the development at $811 million, or about $2,900 per square foot of net lettable area. It also claimed the consideration was arrived at on a willing-buyer willing-seller basis. However, the company did not state the buyer, but sources said that the building was bought by a fund linked to Goldman Sachs. This is based on the fact that Goldman Sachs bought the next-door Chevron House a year earlier.

In January 2011, NTUC Income acquired a 49 percent stake in Savu Investments, the holding company which owns the asset, from Goldman Sachs. In January 2013, NTUC Income bought over Goldman Sach's remaining 51% stake in Savu Investments, the acquisition valuing the property at around $660 million, or less than $2,400 per square foot, on a net lettable space of over 278,000 square feet.

== Architecture ==
Collyer Quay Centre is linked to the 33-storey Chevron House by a four-storey glass galleria. According to the Urban Redevelopment Authority (URA), the two buildings are designed and planned in parallel, with each tower takes on different architectural expressions, while complementing each other to "strengthen the urban quality" of Raffles Place.

The building is topped off by a two-storey navigating beacon. URA claims it recalls the maritime history of the Collyer Quay area. Its facade is expressed in three parts, which breaks the verticality of the 37-storey tower and creates a stepping down effect that matches with the height of its shorter neighbour, Tung Centre.

At the urban level, the two buildings respect and are designed around established patterns of pedestrian movement and urban use. The bank lobby is lifted to the upper floors to create Change Alley on the first storey, a pedestrian thoroughfare lined with retail activities that is today, a well-used and vibrant space linking Raffles Place to Collyer Quay.

== See also ==
- List of tallest buildings in Singapore
