= Mount Wallich =

Coastal hill in Singapore

Coordinates: 1.2764°N 103.8447°E

Mount Wallich was a small coastal hill located near the southern coast of Singapore. Survey maps from the late 1800's show the hill was located within the bounds of streets now known as: Reserve Road, Cecil Street, and Telok Ayer Street.

== History ==
The hill was named after Nathaniel Wallich, a Dutch surgeon and botanist who fell ill on a trip to Singapore in 1822 and took up residence in a house at the top of the hill called Botany Hall. Over the next few months, Wallich helped Sir Stamford Raffles submit a proposal to the government to establish the Singapore Botanical & Experimental Garden, a forerunner to the Singapore Botanic Gardens.

In the 1860s, work began on an ambitious project led by engineer George Collyer to build a seawall stretching from Johnston's Pier to the old Telok Ayer fish market. In order to the build the structure, land seaward of Commercial Square (now Raffles Place) was reclaimed using dirt from Mount Wallich. The project was completed in 1864 and the area became known as Collyer Quay.

In 1885, Mount Wallich was levelled for the Telok Ayer Reclamation Scheme, a project to further expand Collyer Quay. It was a difficult and tedious project as the hills were rocky and the Public Works Department (PWD) had to blast out parts of Mount Wallich. The area that was reclaimed would become the Central Business District (CBD) of Singapore, as well as the areas where Raffles Quay, Anson Road, and Robinson Road currently lie.
