= Collyer Quay =

Road in Singapore

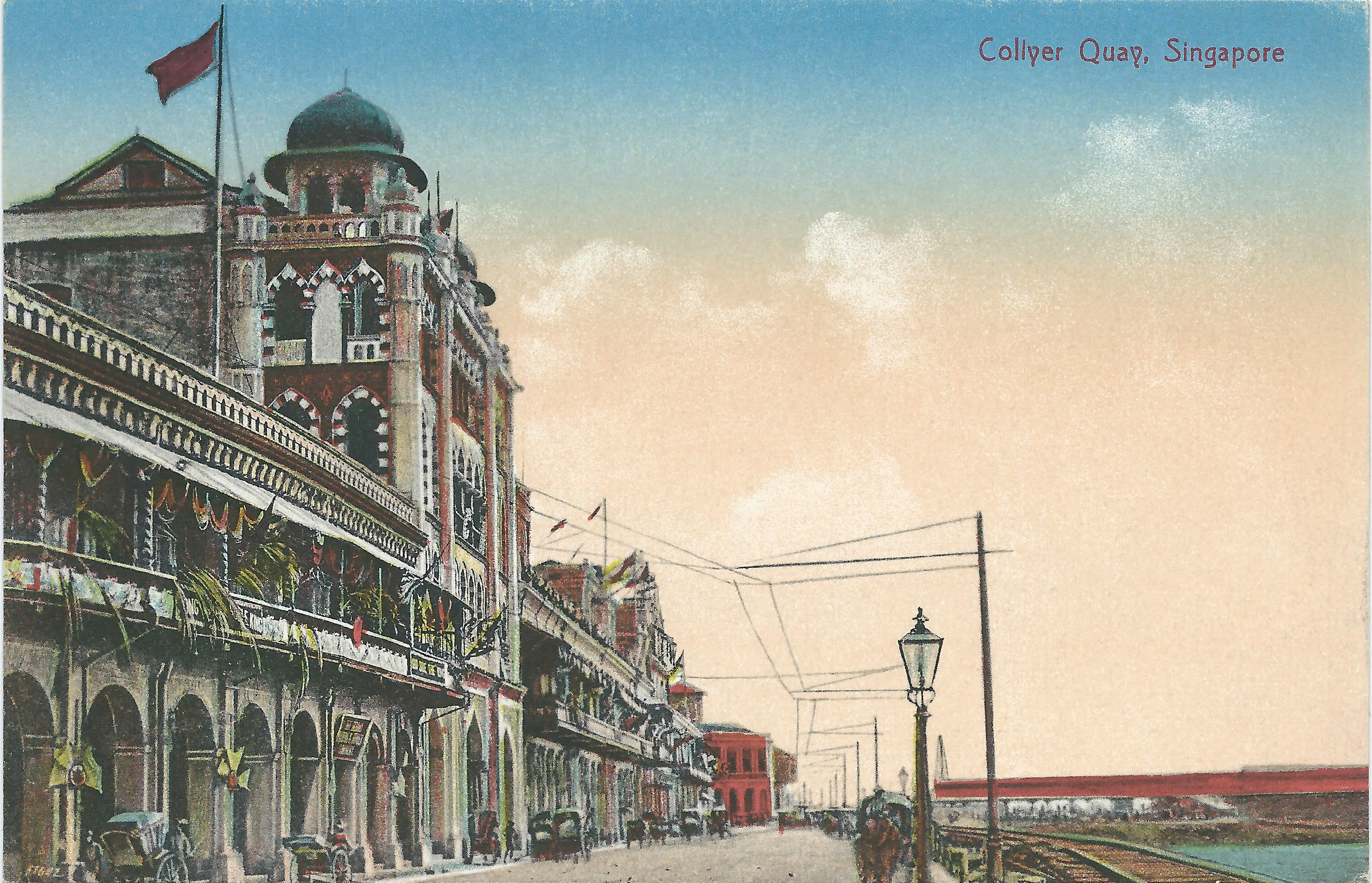
Collyer Quay, circa 1910

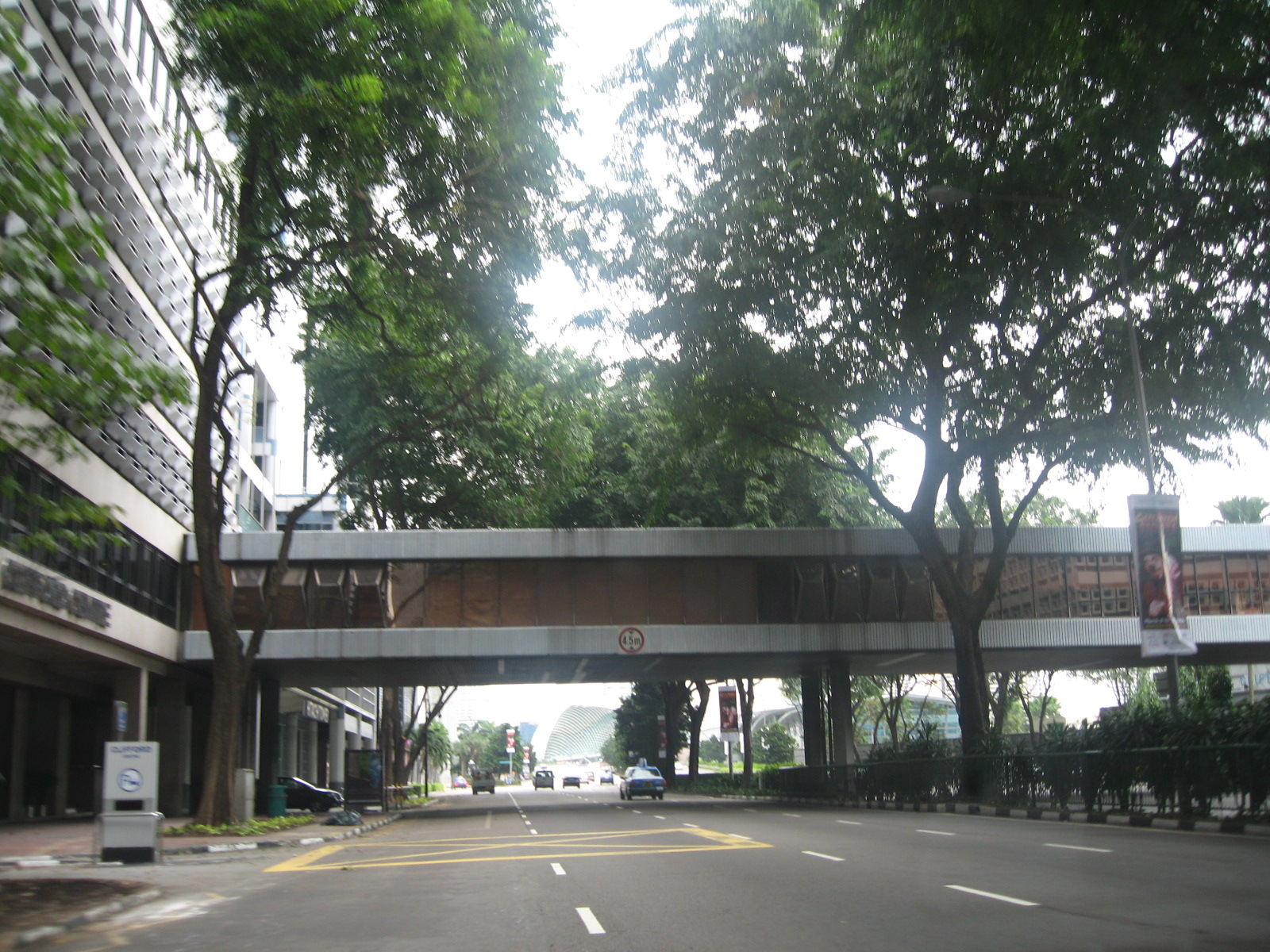
Collyer Quay, 2006

Collyer Quay (Chinese: 哥烈码头) is a road in Downtown Core, Singapore that starts after Fullerton Road and ends at the junction of Raffles Quay, Finlayson Green and Marina Boulevard. The road houses several landmarks namely, Clifford Pier, Change Alley, Hitachi Tower, Ocean Towers and Ocean Financial Centre.

== History ==
In 1858, George Collyer designed and began construction on a sea wall stretching form Johnston's Pier to the old Telok Ayer Fish Market. The project included reclaiming land using dirt from Mount Wallich to build a roadway behind the sea wall. Completed in 1864, the road was named Collyer Quay.

Before its development, the area was a sea-beach filled with out-houses and sheds. By 1866, 2 years after Collyer Quay was completed, a whole line of office buildings had been erected along the new road. A continuous, sea-facing veranda linked the second floors of all the buildings. Workers, observing with telescopes from the veranda, announced the arrival of their company ships.

Until the late 1960s the front of Clifford Pier was a carpark. After office hours the carpark was transformed into a gathering place for musicians, mobile foodstalls and prostitutes. The carpark later made way for road-widening and construction of new developments.

== New developments ==
An artist's impression of the new developments

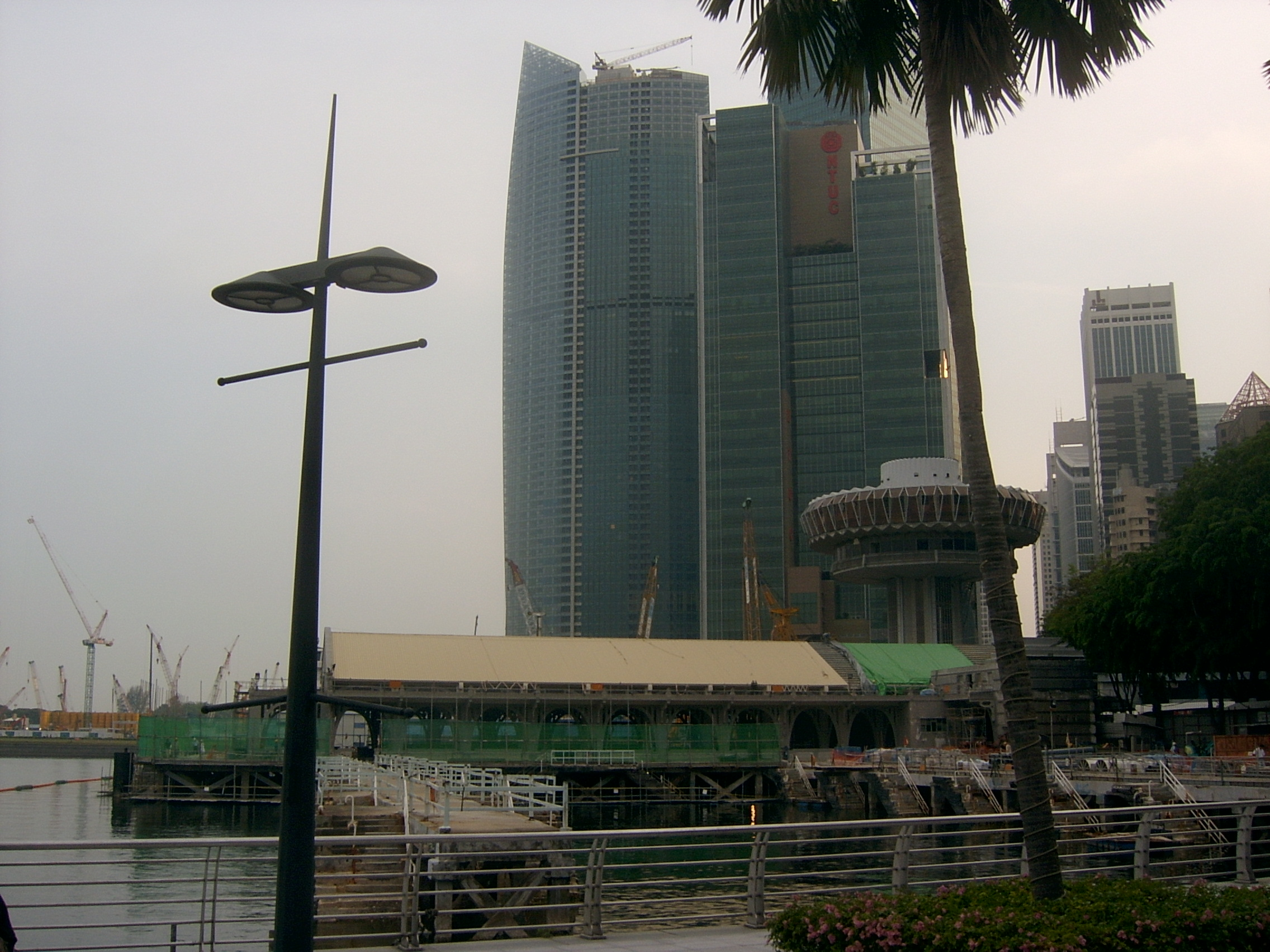
Construction of the Fullerton Bay Hotel in 2007

There are new developments at the water front property along Collyer Quay between Marina Boulevard and One Fullerton. A new waterfront hotel, called the Fullerton Bay Hotel, opened in 2010. The historical buildings, these being Clifford Pier and the former Customs Harbour Branch Building, were incorporated into the new developments. The hotel and the historical buildings are connected to incorporate the Marina Promenade and to allow free pedestrian traffic along Marina Bay. A new office building, OUE Bayfront was also built to replace the former OUE building which stood beside Clifford Pier.
