= Chevron House =

Office skyscraper in Singapore

30 Raffles Place
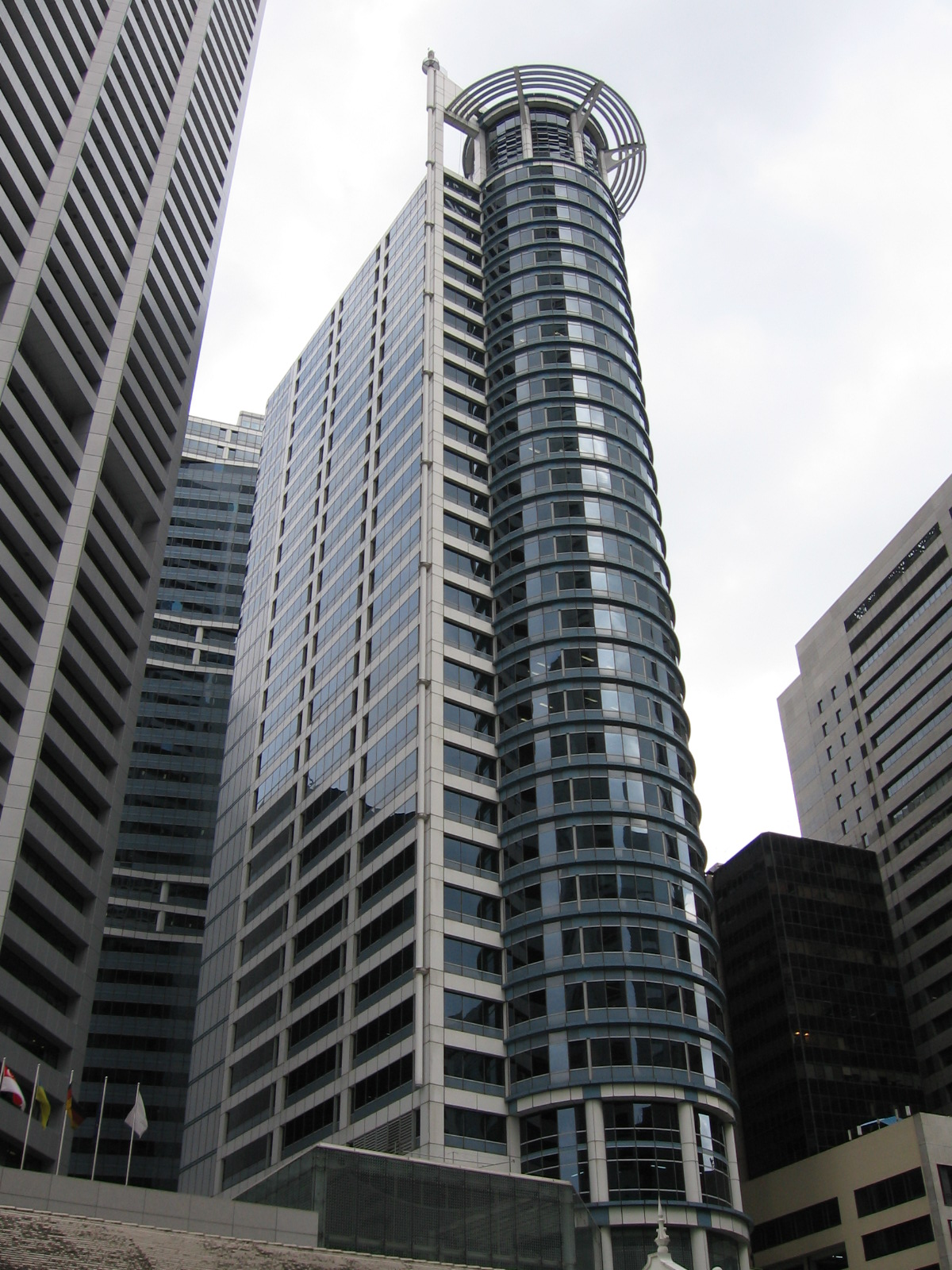
- Interactive map of the 30 Raffles Place area
- Former names: Chevron House

General information
- Status: Completed
- Type: Mixed Development
- Architectural style: Modernism
- Location: 30 Raffles Place, Singapore 048622
- Coordinates: 1.2843°N 103.851955°E
- Owner: The Management Strata Title No. 4735

Height
- Roof: 151 m (495 ft)

Technical details
- Floor count: 33; 3 below ground

Design and construction
- Architects: Murphy/Jahn, Inc. Architects, Architects 61

30 Raffles Place, formerly called Chevron House and Caltex House, is a high-rise skyscraper located in the central business district of Singapore. It is located on 30 Raffles Place, in the financial district of Raffles Place. The building is near several buildings and landmarks, such as Singapore Land Tower, 16 Collyer Quay, CIMB Plaza and The Arcade, all of which are less than 100 metres (110 yd) away. The development has direct underground access to Raffles Place MRT station. 16 Collyer Quay, a nearby neighbors of 30 Raffles Place, shares a four-level retail podium with the building.

30 Raffles Place has a total of 33 floors, excluding 3 basement levels, and it rises 152.0 metres (498.7 ft) above ground.

== History ==
30 Raffles Place was designed by Murphy/Jahn, Inc. Architects and Architects 61, and was completed in 1993, just one year after its next-door neighbour, 16 Collyer Quay. The other firms involved in the development are CapitaLand Commercial Limited, Savu Investments Private Limited, CapitaLand, Obayashi Gumi Corporation, Sendai Eversendai Engineering Group, Steen Consultants Private Limited, PCR Engineers Private Limited, Chevalier Group, PCR Engineers Private Limited, Rider Hunt Levett & Bailey, and Toshiba Elevator and Building Systems Corporation.

=== Goldman Sachs acquisition ===
In September 2007, a Goldman Sachs-linked fund bought Chevron House, at a price of S$730 million. This equates to $2,780 per square foot ($29,924/m^{2}) of net lettable area. This is Goldman Sachs' second major acquisition of an office property in Singapore. It will allow CapitaLand to have a profit of about $150.8 million from the sale of its stake.

Before the sale, Chevron House was owned by several companies. CapitaLand, IP Property Fund Asia and NTUC Income Insurance Co-operative had a stake of 50 per cent, 25 per cent and 25 per cent respectively. A few months later, its neighbors 16 Collyer Quay was also bought by Goldman Sachs.

== Architecture ==
30 Raffles Place models the late-modernist architectural style, and is similar to that of Springleaf Tower and Hitachi Tower. It is mainly built out of aluminium, glass and steel. A distinctive glass rotunda and four-storey high portico is located at the entrance of the building. The rotunda motif is expressed on the roof, capped by radial louvres that provide shade. This strong feature that distincts the building from other skyscrapers in Raffles Place.

== Tenants ==
Major tenants of Chevron House includes Planet Fitness. Planet Fitness occupies 17,000 square feet (1,600 m^{2}) of space in the building. It is primarily used as a gym, and has a mezzanine interior with large windows.

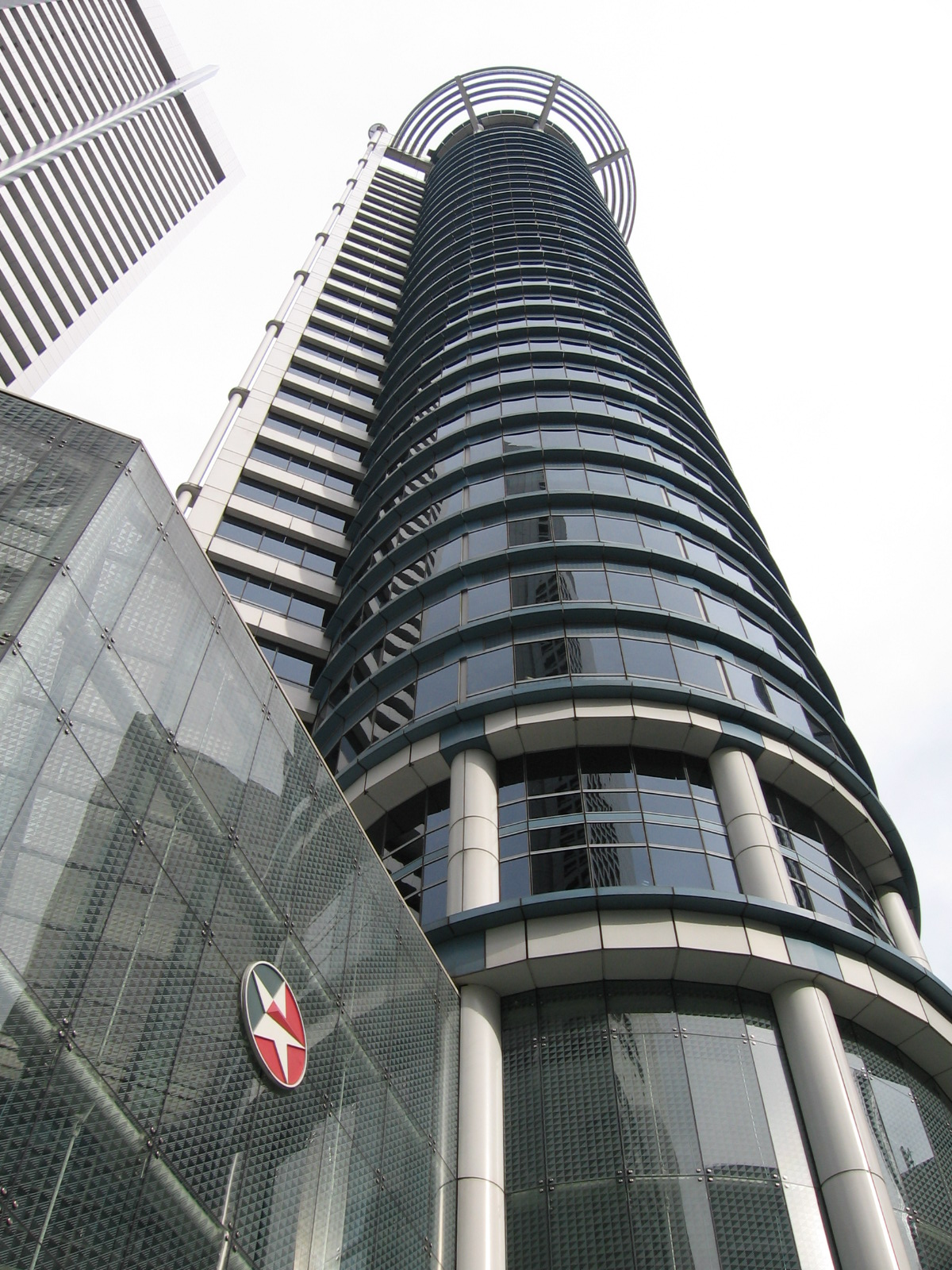
Caltex House street view

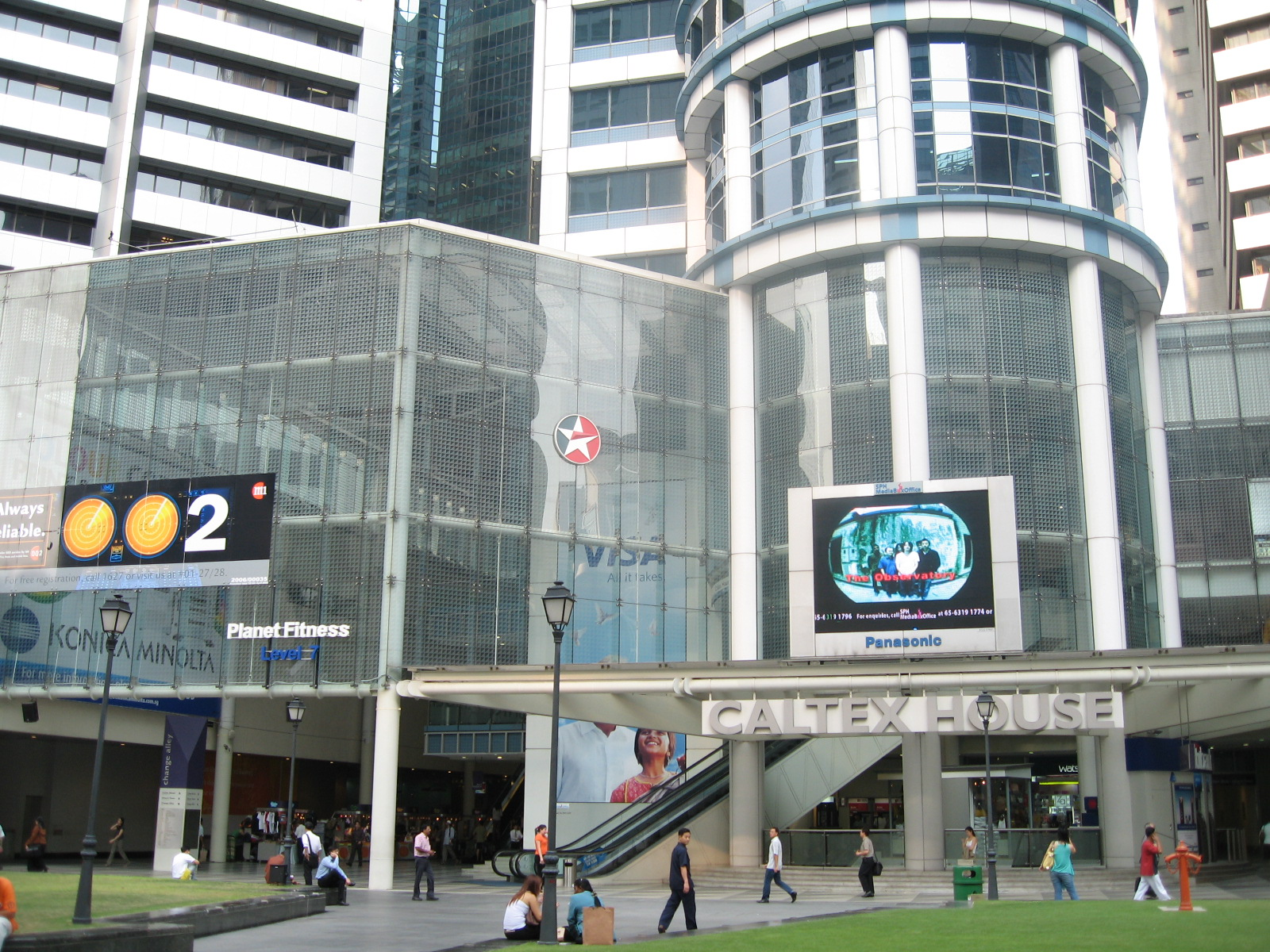
Chevron House atrium

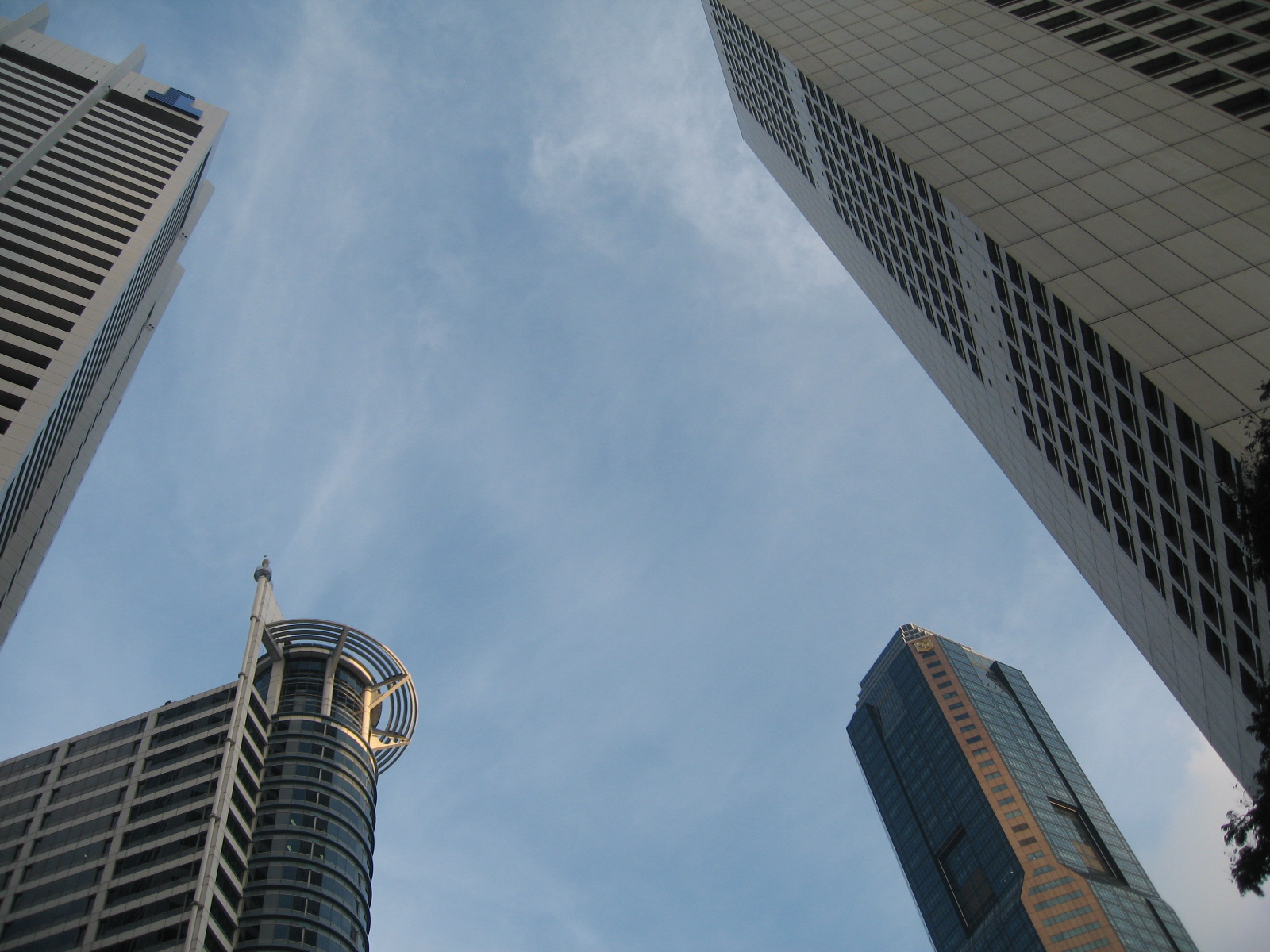
Chevron House (bottom left)

== See also ==
- List of tallest buildings in Singapore
