= Johnston's Pier =

Pier in Collyer Quay, Singapore

- Johnston's pier in the harbor at Singapore.
- Type: Pier
- Location: Collyer Quay, Singapore
- Coordinates: 1°17′06.0″N 103°51′12.5″E
- Official name: Johnston's Pier

History
- Opening date: 13 March 1856; 170 years ago
- Listed: Demolished
- Closure date: 3 June 1933; 93 years ago

Johnston's Pier was a pier, formerly situated at Collyer Quay, Singapore, where it stood from the mid-1850s to the mid-1930s.

== History ==
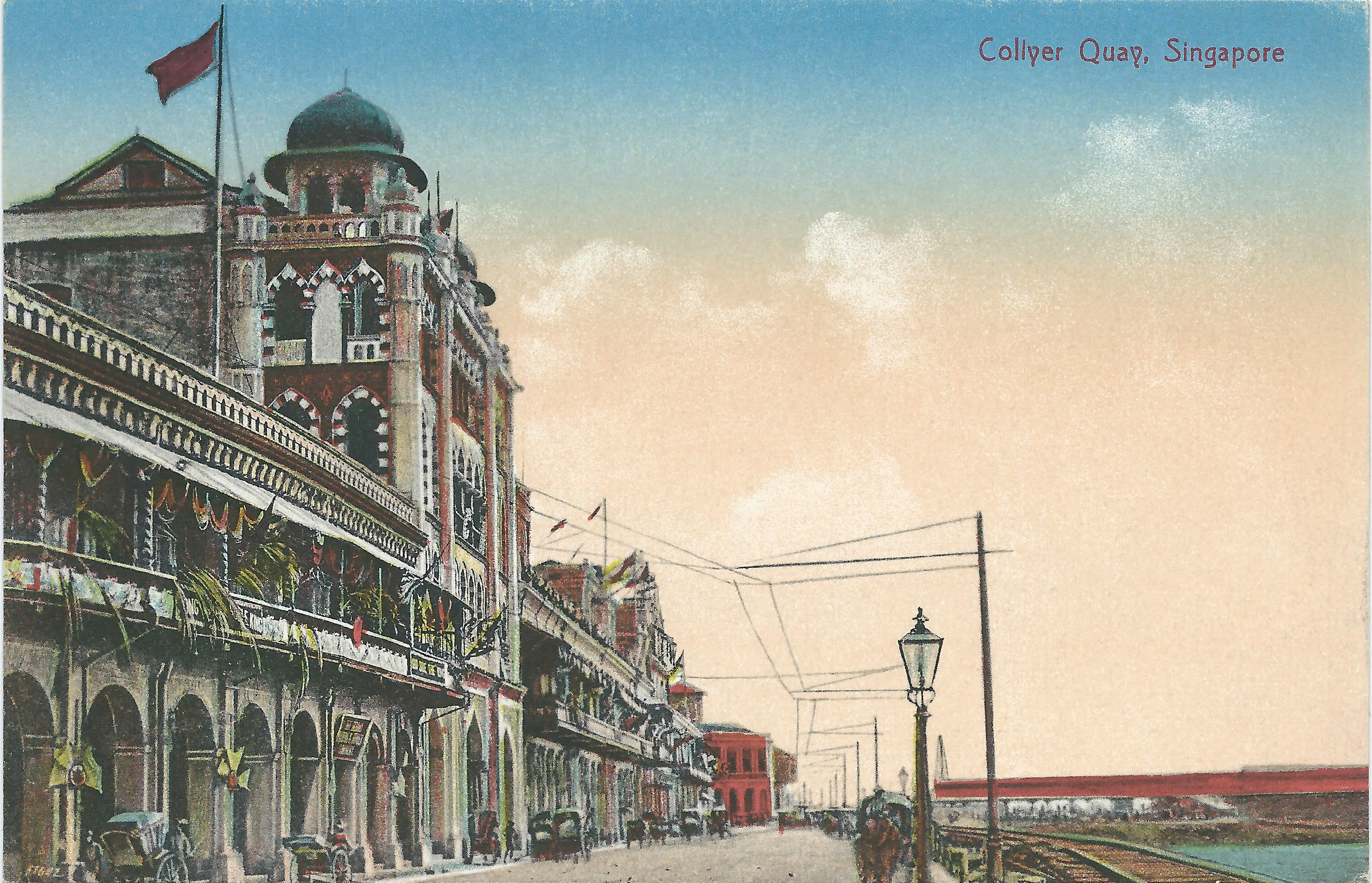
Collyer Quay, Johnston's Pier is on the right

After the establishment of Singapore as a Strait Settlements port, many buildings along its southern shoreline were directly facing the sea. As business and commerce constantly developed along the waterfront, many merchants set up their businesses at Commercial Square with their godowns backed into the waterfront where they had their own jetties.

The idea of constructing a wooden jetty near the godowns of A. L. Johnston & Co. was first mooted to the municipal committee on 26 March 1853 for the convenience of the commercial and shipping interests in Singapore.

After consulting the government surveyor, the municipal committee approved the construction of a stone ghaut on 20 July 1853 to be used as a public landing place instead of the wooden jetty as originally intended. In conjunction with the proposed ghaut, a stone embankment stretching from the proposed ghaut to Battery Road would be built.

Plans for a jetty known as Johnston's Pier was submitted to the municipal committee about 3 months later. On 19 October 1853, the municipal committee approved the construction of the jetty at an expenditure not exceeding S$3,000. A small house for a pier-keeper would also constructed at the inner end of the pier.

=== Launch ===
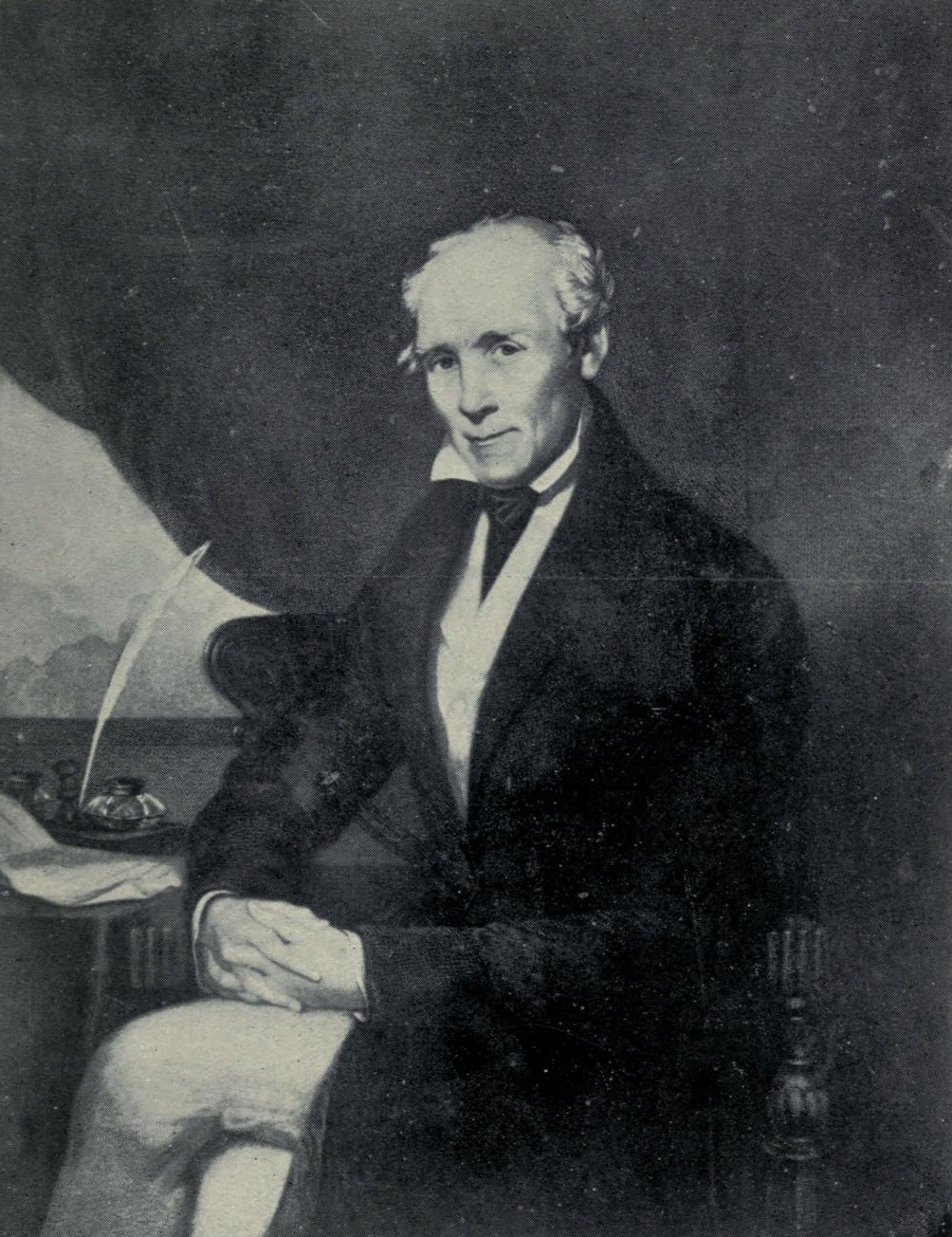
Alexander Johnston

The Engineer Captain Ronald MacPherson officially announced its completion to the Resident Councillor and Chairman of the municipal committee on 13 March 1856, the pier was named after a prominent Scottish businessman Alexander Laurie Johnston, one of the earliest European settlers who had arrived in Singapore in 1819 and established the first merchant firm A. L. Johnston & Co. there in 1820. A male pier-keeper was hired at a salary of S$6 per month for the maintaining of the crane as well as lighting and cleaning of the lamps at the pier.

The wooden jetty was 40-feet wide and stretched 120-feet into the sea. The red lamps which were placed above the pier had led to many local Chinese of Hokkien origin to name the pier as ang teng beh tau (Chinese: 红灯码头, meaning “red lantern harbour”) and to the Malays as lampu merah (meaning “red lamp”).

=== Royal visits ===
Johnston's Pier played host to many royal figures and dignitaries. The visits began in 1869, with the then Duke of Edinburgh, Prince Alfred Ernest Albert. Royal visits were met with great efforts in decoration of the jetty and many areas of the town. Mercantile businesses and private firms participated heavily in welcoming of the royal guests.

=== Closure and demolition ===
By the 1920s, the pier could no longer handle the increased volume of traffic from docking ships. The pier had soon become dilapidated in the 1920s and in 1929, the Governor of the Straits Settlements Sir Cecil Clementi approved plans to build a new pier to replace the former.

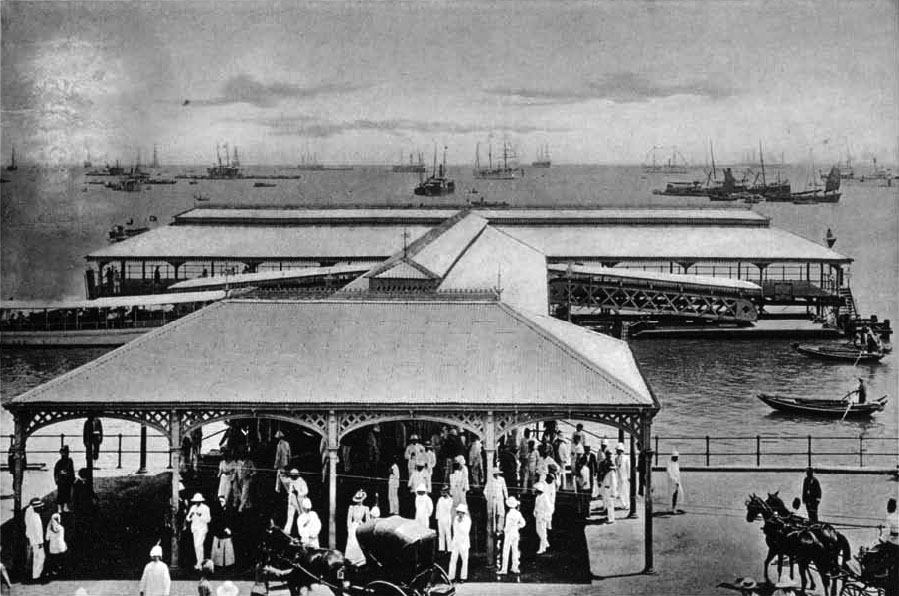
Johnston's Pier, Singapore: completed on 13 March 1856, this jetty cum landing platform stood opposite Fullerton Square.

Johnston's Pier was closed and had its red lamps transferred to a new pier, Clifford Pier, named after Sir Hugh Clifford, which was opened on 3 June 1933. Johnston's Pier's demolition worked started from 3 June 1933, and after much difficulties, it was completed by November 1935.
