= 2001 in Singapore =

- Decades: 1980s; 1990s; 2000s; 2010s; 2020s
- See also: Other events of 2001; Timeline of Singaporean history

The following lists events that happened during 2001 in Singapore.

== Incumbents ==
- President: S.R. Nathan
- Prime Minister: Goh Chok Tong

== Events ==
=== January ===
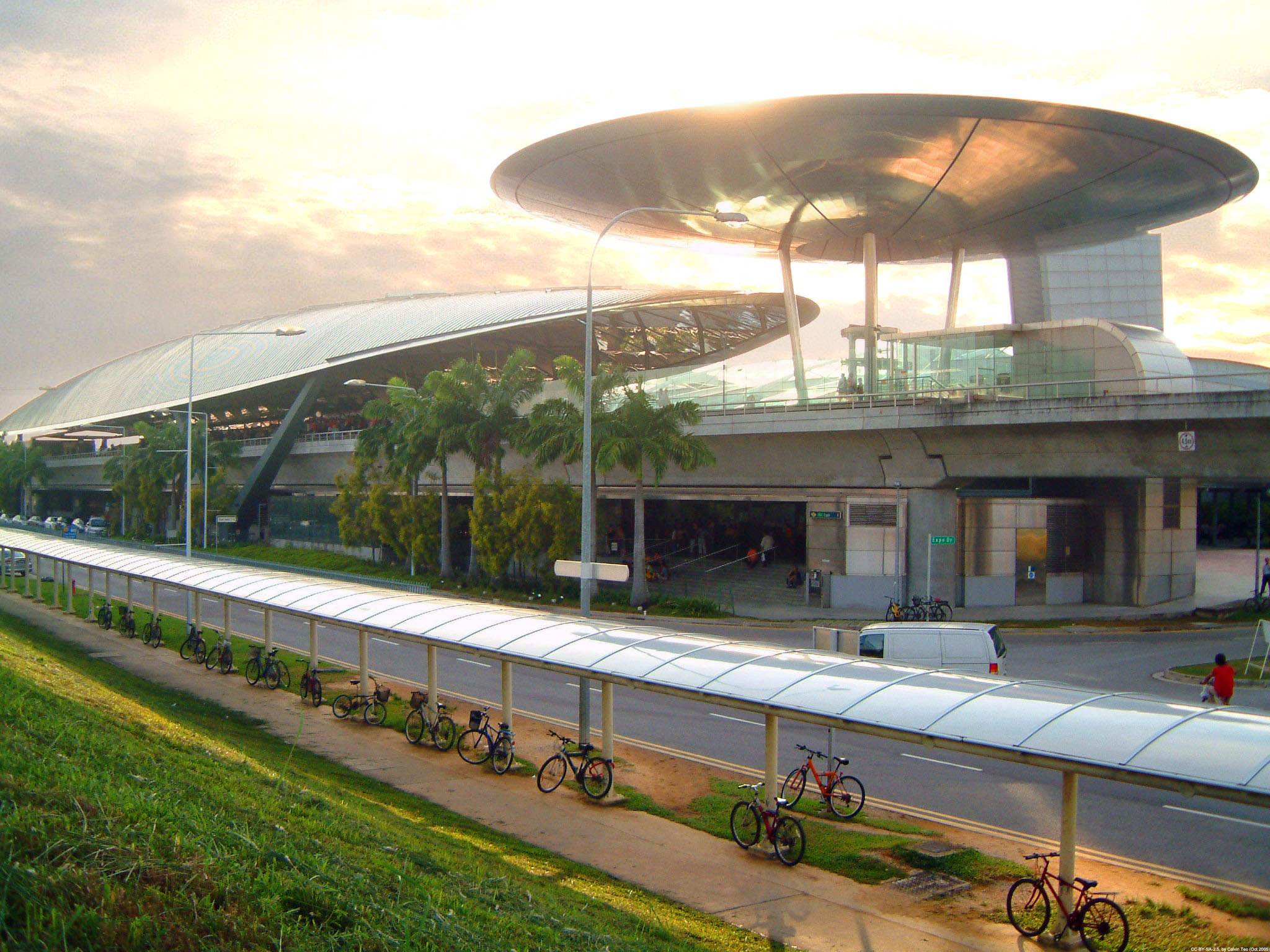
Expo MRT station

- 8 January – Ascendas is formed after a merger of JTC's subsidiaries, namely Arcasia Land with JTC International's Business Parks and Facilities, first announced on 25 August 2000. It merged with Singbridge as Ascendas-Singbridge in 2015 and is acquired by CapitaLand in 2019 as part of an S$11 billion deal.
- 10 January – Expo MRT station is officially opened.
- 12 January – Jurong Port is formed as a separate corporation operating at arms length from JTC.
- 15 January – A pipeline feeding gas to Singapore from Indonesia's Natuna field in the South China Sea opens.
- 19 January – The national anthem, "Majulah Singapura" is re-arranged to use the lower key of F and recorded in seven official versions.

=== February ===
- 12 February – Pertamina and Singapore Power have signed an agreement to supply natural gas to Singapore for 20 years starting from 2003. These gas supplies will come from South Sumatra.
- 14 February – TVMobile is launched, enabling bus passengers to watch television programmes while travelling.
- 15 February – The Changi Chapel and Museum reopens at a relocated site, which commemorates World War II.
- 18 February – The Hawker Centres Upgrading Programme (HUP) is announced to improve hawker centres. The programme will be carried out in seven phases.
- 27 February – FairPrice starts construction of its new Fresh Food Distribution Centre, making it the only supermarket at that time to own such a facility.

=== March ===
- 1 March – The National Courtesy Campaign is merged as part of Singapore Kindness Movement.
- 3 March – A police land rover from the Airport Police Division lost control and flipped several times across Airport Boulevard near the SATS Inflight Catering Centre in the direction towards the Singapore Changi Airport, killing two officers, SC/CPL Dzulkha Bin Basru, 22, and NSPI Ranosasni Bin Mohamed Salleh, 23. The driver, SGT98227 Tan Chiew Leong Benny, 23, died a day later in hospital. Seven other officers survived the accident, which remains the worst traffic accident in terms of casualties to involve members of the Singapore Police Force.
- 14 March – The Housing and Development Board (HDB) launches the Lift Upgrading Programme (LUP).

=== April ===
- 1 April –
  - Several statutory boards are established. The Health Promotion Board promotes a healthy lifestyle, with the Health Sciences Authority regulating medicines, forensic investigations, and blood donations. The Energy Market Authority encourages competition in the electricity and gas markets, and ensure reliable supply, resulting in the reconstitution of Public Utilities Board, handling water-related issues. The Intellectual Property Office of Singapore will handle intellectual property issues.
  - The Baby Bonus Scheme is launched to encourage people to have families. It has since undergone enhancements.
- 9 April –
  - JTC Consultants is formed from the merger of JTC Corporation's (JTC) Technical Services Group and the international consultancy arm of JTC International, incorporating the consultancy arm. It was renamed Jurong International and then Surbana Jurong in 2015.
  - DBS Bank announced the acquisition of Dao Heng Bank (a Hong Kong bank), which aims to increase DBS' standing as a regional bank. The acquisition was approved two days later and was completed in September 2001.
- 10 April –
  - Ganga and Jamuna Shreshta, a pair of Nepali conjoined twins, are successfully separated.
- 15 April – The Housing and Development Board (HDB) launches the Build To Order (BTO) flats system, where flats are built according to demand. The system is fully in place by January 2002.
- 19 April –
  - The first Car Free Day is launched in Singapore.
  - Amendments are passed to prevent foreign broadcasters from interfering with Singapore's domestic politics.
  - SAFRA Yishun Country Club is officially opened.
- 20 April – Amendments to the Parliamentary Elections Act are passed to introduce overseas voting and e-voting, taking effect on 15 May. However, after 9/11, overseas voting is suspended during the 2001 General Election, only resuming during the 2006 General Election. The law also sets a recount margin of two percent and restricts use of electoral registers for privacy.
- 21 April – Rivervale Mall in Sengkang officially opens.
- 22 April – The National Recycling Programme is launched, with Yuhua in Jurong the first estate to have this initiative. It aims to encourage Singaporeans to recycle more, with the iconic blue bins in place.
- 26 April – The Singapore Broadcasting Authority grants a licence to SPH MediaWorks for the launch of Channel U and TVWorks.
- 28 April – The Land Transport Authority announces the construction of the Kallang–Paya Lebar Expressway and Stage 2 of the Circle MRT line. Both projects are scheduled by 2006, but only opened in 2007 and 2010 respectively.

=== May ===
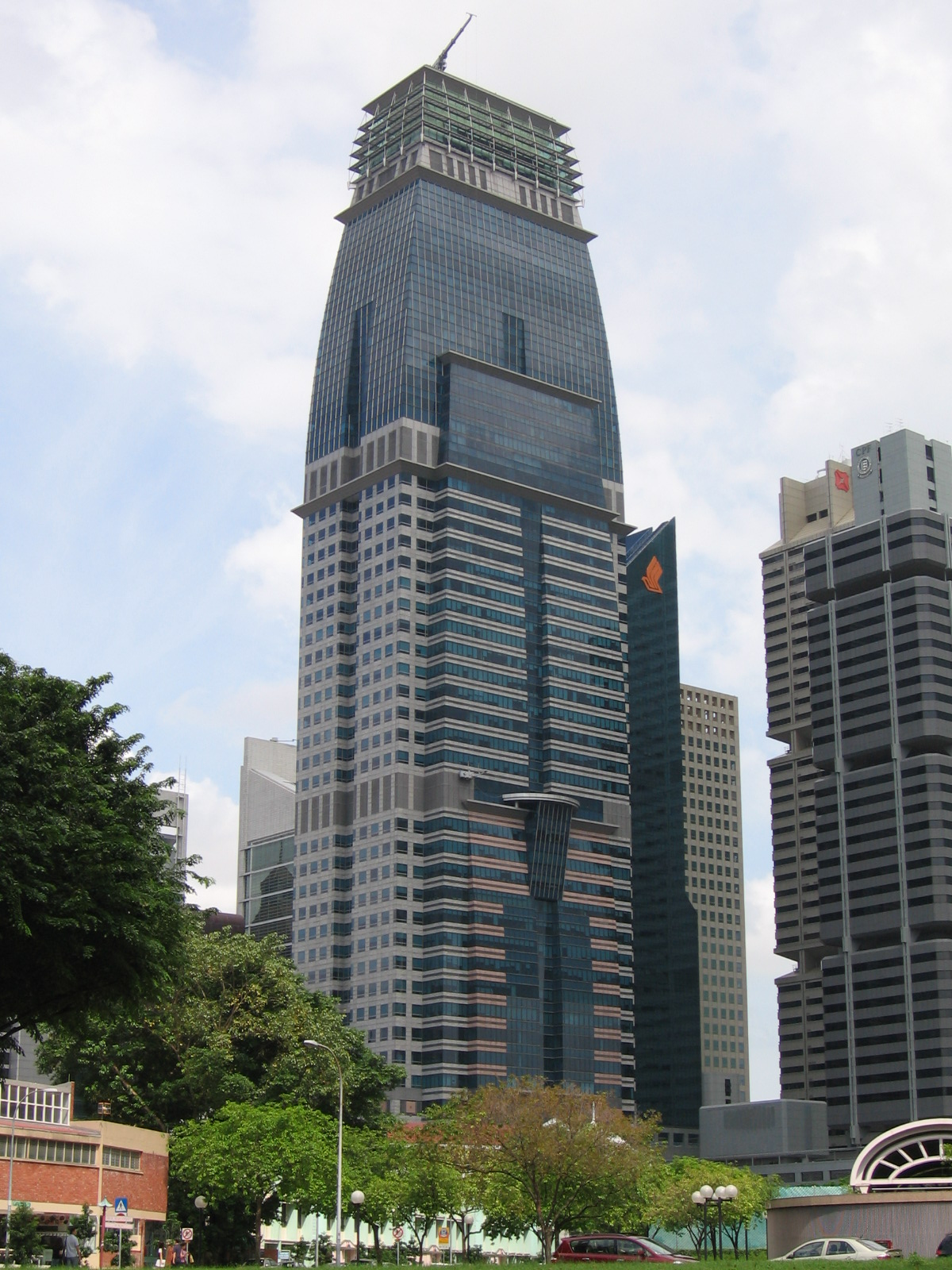
Capital Tower, CapitaLand's headquarters

- 6 May – Channel U is launched by Singapore Press Holdings through SPH MediaWorks to compete with MediaCorp's channels.
- 14 May –
  - CityTV is launched as a mainstream TV channel, renamed from SportCity.
  - A murder took place in Hougang. Anthony Ler manipulated a youth into murdering his estranged wife Annie Leong. A few days later, Ler and the youth were charged. On 5 December, Ler was found guilty and sentenced to hang. The sentence was carried out on 13 December 2002. The youth was spared the death sentence because he was underage and was detained indefinitely until clemency was granted on 2 November 2018. The clemency was granted by President Halimah for the petition filed by the youth's lawyer, Peter Ong Lip Cheng.
- 15 May – TVMobile is now available at Suntec City food courts.
- 16 May – Capital Tower, the headquarters of CapitaLand is officially opened, initially planned as POSBank's headquarters. New plans are also announced to make the city area vibrant, including more pedestrian links and shops in underground links.
- 20 May – TVWorks is launched by Singapore Press Holdings through SPH MediaWorks to compete with MediaCorp's channels.
  - The TV Land musical is held as the central point of the channel's launch.
- 26 May – A smoke grenade explosion during a live exercise on Pulau Senang injures eight police officers, one of whom lost his right arm.
- 31 May – Murder of Sulaiman bin Hashim: A 17-year-old football player named Sulaiman bin Hashim was brutally assaulted and murdered by youth gang 369 (Salakau) outside a pub in South Bridge Road. Six of the eight members involved were eventually jailed and caned for culpable homicide, rioting and voluntarily causing grievous hurt, while the remaining two are still at large till today.

=== June ===
- 1 June – The Singapore Land Authority is formed to manage and survey land.
- 14 June –
  - A police Sergeant, Quek Yew Ming, is killed when the police scooter he was riding met with a traffic accident at Ophir Road.
  - The Infocomm Development Authority of Singapore approves StarHub's plan to fulfil its local access network obligation by merging with Singapore Cable Vision, forming Singapore's second complete nation-wide telecommunications network.
- 28 June – The Singapore Democratic Alliance is formed as a coalition between four parties.
- 29 June –
  - The Ministry of Health announced a new 650-bed hospital in Jurong, to be completed by 2006.
  - Project Eyeball, Singapore's first integrated print and digital newspaper, was suspended just 10 months after it launched due to weak demand and advertising revenue.

=== July ===
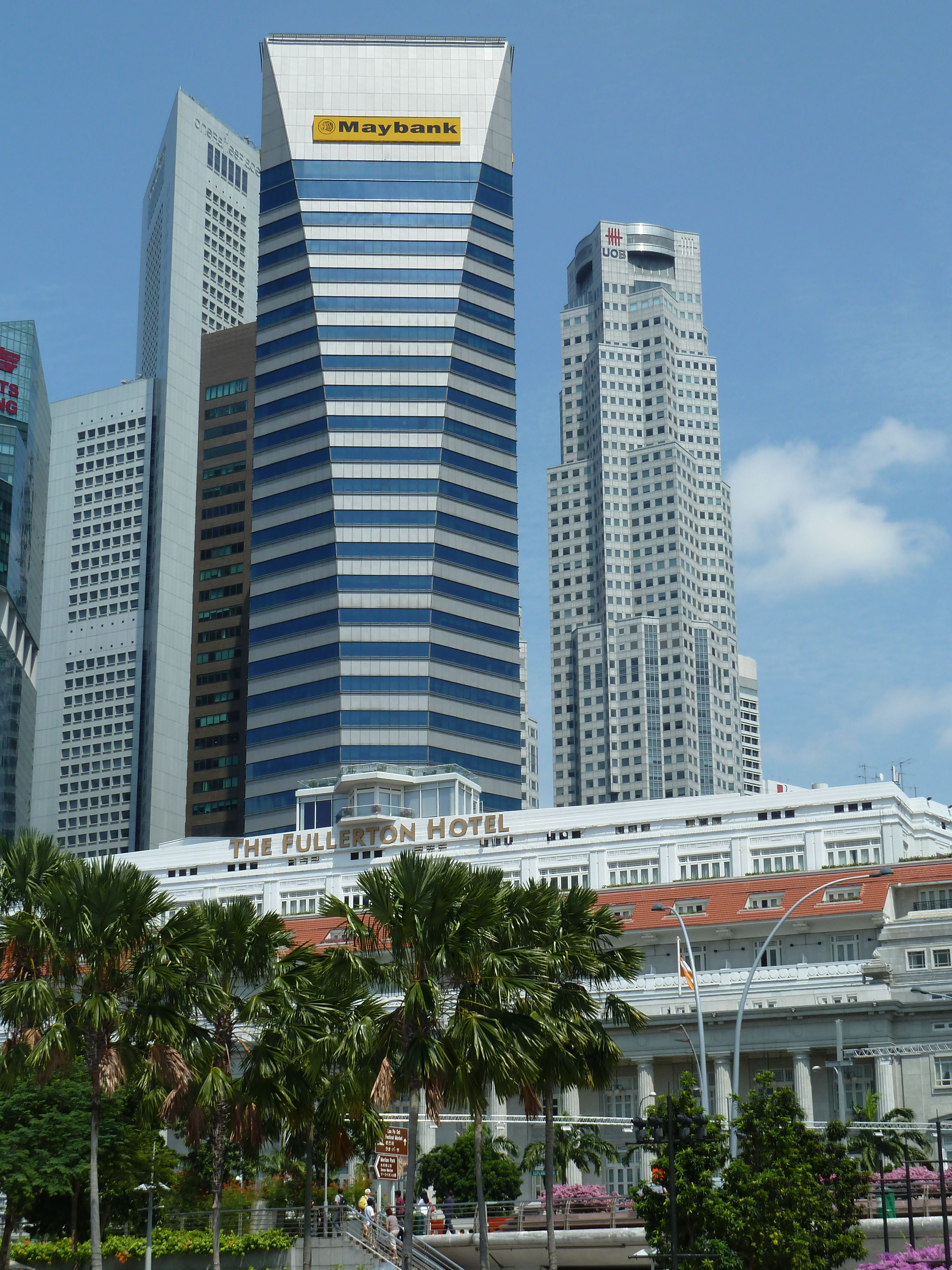
Maybank Tower

- 1 July – The Sporting Singapore Report is released in conjunction with the opening of Choa Chu Kang Sports and Fitness Complex. Among them include empowering National Sports Associations, setting up a Sports School, more sports time and sharing of school facilities, more international sporting events, and the redevelopment of National Stadium, which had been suggested in a Straits Times report on 2 February.
- 5 July – The Singapore Broadcasting Authority asked Sintercom's owner, Dr Tan Chong Kee, to register. The owner decides to shut the site on 20 August.
- 9 July – SMRT Corporation makes a takeover bid for Trans Island Bus Services (TIBS), which is accepted. This results in TIBS being renamed to SMRT Buses on 10 May 2004.
- 25 July – The Tan Tock Seng Hospital is marked as a Historic Institution, along with the opening of TTSH Heritage Museum.
- 26 July – The Maybank Tower is officially opened.
- 31 July – A new signage system for the MRT and LRT system is launched, first announced on 9 July. The new system uses one colour for MRT lines instead of two to differentiate travel directions, alphanumeric codes for stations, end destination numbers and new symbols.

=== August ===
- 8 August – SMRT is appointed the operator of the Circle MRT line after winning the bid.
- 12 August – A 'fireball' UFO was spotted by some 15 people at the Tuas Second Link connecting Malaysia and Singapore.
- 13 August – Another set of amendments to the Parliamentary Elections Act are passed to allow internet campaigning, as well as disallow exit polls and contesting more than one constituency by any electoral candidate.
- 17 August – The Heritage Tree Scheme and Heritage Road Scheme are announced to conserve mature trees and tree-lined roads respectively. At the same time, Hindhede Nature Park is officially opened.
- 31 August – United Overseas Bank will acquire the Overseas Union Bank, outbidding DBS Bank.

=== September ===
- 18 September – MediaCorp Teletext is now operational 24 hours daily, with enhancements to news programmes.

=== October ===
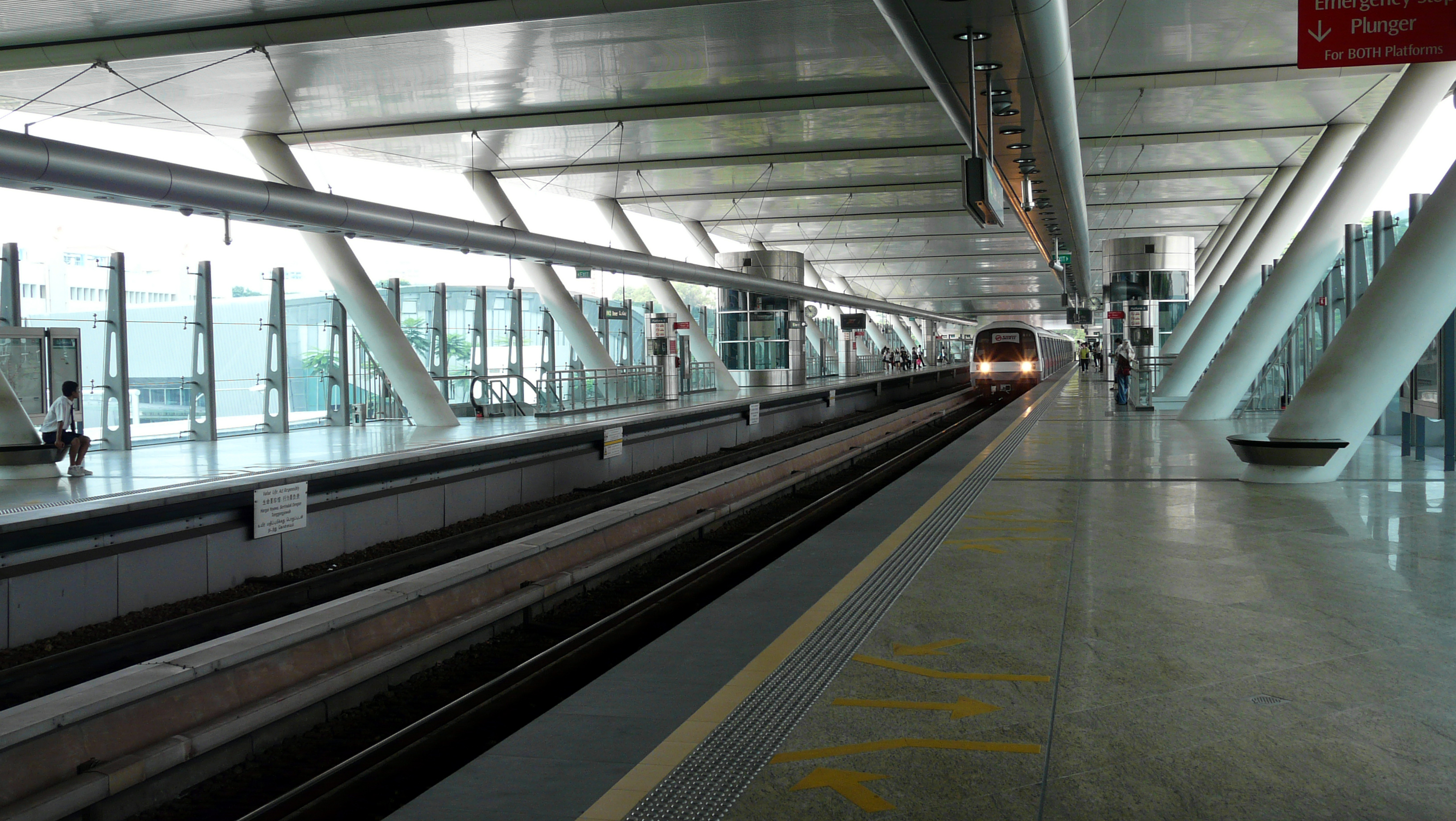
Dover MRT station

- 1 October –
  - The Civil Service College Singapore is set up to train civil servants.
  - The Family Court moves to the former Ministry of Labour building, following the closure of its previous office on 28 September in Paterson Road.
- 3 October – WKRZ 91.3 and UFM 1003 are launched by Singapore Press Holdings.
- 12 October – Virgin Mobile Singapore is launched as a mobile virtual network operator (MVNO) between SingTel and Virgin Mobile. After a failed attempt to compete in the telco market, the service shuts on 11 October 2002.
- 18 October – Dover MRT station is opened along an existing MRT line, making it the first infill station in Singapore.
- 23 October – During the official opening of Dover MRT station, three new MRT lines are announced, namely the Bukit Timah Line (now Downtown MRT line Stage 2), the Jurong Region Line (now the Jurong Region MRT line) and the Eastern Region Line (since merged into Thomson–East Coast MRT line Stages 4 and 5 and Downtown MRT line Stage 3).
- 25 October – Nomination day for 2001 General Election: The People's Action Party wins 55 uncontested seats and hence returns to power.
- 27 October – 'Cheers!' stores are launched for SMRT stations, bringing convenience to Singaporeans.

=== November ===
- 1 November – SBS Transit is launched after a rebranding exercise from Singapore Bus Service, with the new logo unveiled on 28 November.
- 3 November – 2001 General Election: The People's Action Party led by Goh Chok Tong wins 82 out of 84 seats (including 55 uncontested seats) with a vote share of 75.3%, with the opposition winning the remaining two. Chiam See Tong and Low Thia Khiang of the Singapore Democratic Alliance and the Workers' Party, retain Potong Pasir SMC and Hougang SMC respectively.
- 9 November – SembCorp's new cogen plant is officially opened in Jurong Island, making it the largest cogen plant in Singapore and the first Independent Producer Plant.
- 11 November – The nine Community Development Councils are reduced to five, namely the Central Singapore Community Development Council, North East Community Development Council, North West Community Development Council, South East Community Development Council, and the South West Community Development Council.
- 12 November – The Sun Yat Sen Nanyang Memorial Hall is officially opened.
- 13 November – The Chinatown Food Street is opened, bringing back street hawkers after a ban since 1982 due to hygiene concerns. The plans are first announced on 7 February.
- 30 November – TVMobile is now available on Bintan Resorts ferries.

=== December ===
- 4 December – The Science Hub (now one-north) is officially launched by JTC Corporation as a science park.
- 6 December – Construction starts on Biopolis, a research area in one-north.
- 9–24 December – 15 suspected militants of Jemaah Islamiah are arrested for an alleged bomb plot.
- 20 December – Reclamation works around the Chek Jawa area are called off after feedback by nature groups so that discussions can be held to ensure marine life in the area is protected.
- 27 December –
  - Tropical Storm Vamei hits Singapore.
  - Steven Tan, a contestant on Who Wants to be a Millionaire won S$250,000; at that point he was the biggest game show winner in the history of Singaporean television.

=== Date unknown ===
- The Health Promotion Board launches the Healthier Choice Symbol to encourage healthier products.

== Births ==
- 13 July – Damien Teo, actor

== Deaths ==
- 18 January – Rahim Ishak, journalist, diplomat and former PAP Member of Parliament for Siglap Constituency (b. 1925).
- 16 February – K. T. Samuel, trade unionist and former Executive Secretary of NTUC INCOME (b. 1934).
- 20 February – Buang bin Omar Junid, former Parliamentary Secretary to the Ministry of Community Affairs and former PAP Member of Parliament for Kallang Constituency and Whampoa Constituency (b. 1922).
- 22 February – Lim Cher Kheng, former Democratic Party legislative assemblyman for Changi Constituency (b. 1924).
- 26 February – Ong Tjin An, financier, stockbroker and corporate executive (b. 1942).
- 12 April – Edmund W. Barker, former Minister for Law (b. 1920).
- 14 May – Annie Leong, murder victim of 'Z' and Anthony Ler (b. 1970–1971).
- 23 May – Lee Chiaw Meng, former Cabinet Minister and former PAP Member of Parliament for Farrer Park Constituency and Tanah Merah Constituency (b. 1937).
- 31 May – Sulaiman bin Hashim, national football player and murder victim (b. 1983).
- 2 June – Saenphan Thawan, murder victim of Seethong Phichet, Thongthot Yordsa-Art, and Dornchinnamat Yingyos (b. 1978).
- 5 July – Patrick Loh, educator and founding Principal of Catholic Junior College (b. 1915).
- 6 August – S. Shan Ratnam, medical pioneer (b. 1928).
- 10 August – Shankar Suppiahmaniam, murder victim of Kanesan Ratnam (b. 1982).
- 2 October – Soh San, murder victim of Gunasegaran Ramasamy (b. 1973).
- 22 October – Ng Soo Peng, 1st Chairman of Stock Exchange of Singapore (b. 1928).
- 30 October – Mohamad Ghazali bin Ismail, former PAP Member of Parliament for Aljunied Constituency (b. 1939).
- 4 November – Ng Eng Teng, sculptor, winner of 1981 Cultural Medallion (b. 1934).
- 17 November – Seah Tin Toon, ex-WWII resistance fighter (b. 1922).
- 22 December – Lourdusamy Lenin Selvanayagan, murder victim of Arun Prakash Vaithilingam (b. 1978).
