= Maybank Tower =

Maybank Tower may refer to:

- Maybank Tower (Kuala Lumpur), former Maybank headquarters
- Maybank Tower (Singapore)
- Merdeka 118, current Maybank headquarters now known as Merdeka Maybank Tower
