= Patrick Loh =

Singaporean educator (1915 – 2001)

- Loh in the 1960s.

Personal life
- Born: Andrew Martin Loh; 19 August 1915
- Died: 5 July 2001 (aged 85) East Region, Singapore
- Home town: Singapore
- Education: St. Joseph's Institution, Singapore; University of London
- Other name: Ildephonsus Patrick Loh
- Occupation: Educator, religious brother

Religious life
- Institute: De La Salle Brothers

Andrew Martin Loh (19 August 1915 – 5 July 2001), better known under the religious name Brother Ildephonsus Patrick Loh, was a Singaporean schoolteacher, educationist and rock collector. He was the director of Saint Patrick's School from 1964 to 1966 and of St. Joseph's Institution from 1967 to 1974. He became the founding principal of Catholic Junior College in 1975, serving in this position until 1978.

== Early life and education ==
Loh was born on 19 August 1915. He studied at the St. Joseph's Institution in Singapore and took the London Matriculation Examination in June 1932. He graduated from the University of London with an external degree in mathematics, physics and geography.

== Career ==
=== Teaching ===
A De La Salle Brother, Loh began his career as a teacher in 1936 at the St. Xavier's Institution in Penang. He taught geography and physics, as well as chemistry, literature and English despite not receiving formal training in those subjects. Michael Broughton, a student of his, commented: "There was only one subject he could not teach – art. He could not even draw a tree."

==== St. Patrick's School ====
He came to Singapore in 1964 and assumed the post of director at the Saint Patrick's School, which then comprised a primary school and two secondary schools; one for morning classes and the other for afternoon classes. The former was fairly reputable, but the latter, established for "over-aged" students who did not qualify for the regular stream, "suffered a poor image." To fix this, he reorganised the schools such that lower secondary students went to the afternoon school while the upper secondary school went to the morning school. This "gradually worked out" despite some initial opposition from parents and teachers due to the afternoon school's poor public perception. In addition to the three schools, Loh was responsible for the pre-University classes, the special classes and the hostel, though he had the support of the Brothers, without which he "would have gone mad".

To help develop the students' public speaking skills, Loh introduced a requirement for each student to speak in front of the class on a topic of their choice for a minute. He also upgraded the school's library, which was then managed by him and the Brothers, so as to not put additional responsibilities onto the teachers. He also extended its operating hours to 10 p.m.. He claimed that this move resulted in a 90% pass rate for Secondary Four students in that year, the highest the school had seen in 15 years. Additionally, the school saw its first presidential scholar, future diplomat Barry Desker.

In this period, there was a "pressure" to provide education in all four of the country's official languages despite a shortage of teachers. Schools in that period were "bursting at the seams" and did not have enough classrooms. There were "floating classes" who would have to hold their classes in spaces such as laboratories. Additionally, the school was required to "play [its] part" in the "nation-building" following Singapore's separation from Malaysia in August 1965. Being located by the seaside, it occasional had to deal with explosives planted as part of Konfrontasi, one of which smashed the windows of Loh's office. In 1966, he stepped down to become the director of the much more prestigious St. Joseph's Institution (SJI), assuming that position at the start of 1967. He was the oldest principal of St. Patrick's by the time of his resignation.

==== St. Joseph's Institution ====
As principal of SJI, Loh again wished to reorganise the separate morning and afternoon schools such that they were instead divided into upper and lower secondary schools, though this proposal was met with much stronger opposition as the school was more set in its ways, which he attributed to the school's long history and sense of tradition. Upon noticing that a class did not have a teacher, Loh would often reportedly "simply walk in" and teach the class himself. Students of SJI then considered him a "jolly good fellow." His students at SJI included future SJI principal Michael Broughton, who recalled that Loh guided the school through a period of "great change in the education system", and national hockey player Farleigh Clarke, who claimed that Loh had "no hesitation using [the cane] on [him]" for being a "naughty rascal". He "had a heart for weaker students" and aided less fortunate students in acquiring used textbooks. Other students included politician and brigadier-general George Yeo, Deputy Prime Minister Teo Chee Hean and journalist Felix Soh.

In March 1974, it was announced that Loh would be stepping down as principal as he was to head the Catholic Junior College (CJC), to be opened the following year as the nation's first Catholic junior college. Loh had previously supported the proposal for a junior college for the Catholic schools. The staff and students held a surprise farewell for him on 31 May, his last day as principal; they had practised for the ceremony over the previous two days when Loh had been preoccupied by external meetings. His successor at SJI was Brother Joseph Kiely, previously the deputy principal at SJI and also a principal of St. Patrick's.

==== Catholic Junior College ====
After stepping down from SJI, Loh spent the next three months in Taiwan studying Mandarin as Catholic Junior College was to conduct lessons in both English and Chinese. The college's premises had yet to be completed on its initial opening, and so the school operated out of SJI, Montfort Secondary School, CHIJ and Catholic High School in its first four months. In its second year, the school suffered from a shortage of teaching staff. They received little help in this regard from the Ministry of Education, which was suffering from the same problem. He also attempted to unify the Chinese and English streams under a common identity.

As principal of CJC, Loh pushed for lowering the standard of entry for pre-Univeristy classes from 20 points to 16 points, believeing that the former allowed too many students to qualify through extracurricular activities, resulting in the college taking in many students who "seldom" pass the A-level examinations. This was partially a result of the school's attempt to accept as many students from the Catholic schools as possible by lowering the entry requirements; this led better-scoring students to apply for National Junior College instead and let in several students who were not as well-equipped to take on the A-levels, resulting in a "vicious cycle" where the college's overall results were poorer. To solve this, the entry level was raised in general, though it was lowered for affiliated schools only, and Loh himself went on a "public relations" campaign for the school.

==== Post-retirement activities ====
He retired from the education service at the end of 1978, after which he was succeeded once again by Brother Kiely. He was conferred the Public Administration Medal (Bronze) in that year. He later recalled his time as principal as something that he "[could not] say was a source of enjoyment", finding it a "very heavy responsibility" which he "felt obliged to fulfill whether [he] liked it or not." He additionally noted that it was "nerve-wracking" having to deal with "irate" parents. Loh attended courses on counselling and pastoral work in the United States and Manila on his retirement from CJC. He continued as a moral instruction teacher at several local Catholic schools, a Bible Knowledge teacher at SJI, CJC and St. Michael's School, and as a supervisor to the Christian Brothers' primary schools, namely St. Anthony's Primary School, the De La Salle School, St. Michael's and St. Stephen's School. Loh oversaw the schools' principal selection, class numbers and upkeep of facilities among various other responsibilities. He remained in this position until 1992. He felt that being under the Ministry of Education was akin to "being in a pressure cooker", and that he was largely free of this pressure after retiring.

=== Educationist ===
As an educationist, Loh was a strong advocate for moral education in stages and for "special attention" to be given to "smart children" as the country's "only" and "best resource." He supported the establishment of the Institute of Education, finding that this was an effective way to counter the "exodus" of teachers to the private sector. In 1975, he was selected to be a member of a panel, alongside educator Ruth Wong, lecturer Gwee Yee Hean and journalist and historian John Drysdale, chaired by civil servant Tay Seow Huah and featuring Prime Minister Lee Kuan Yew, who was to explain and answer questions relating to the government's bilingual education policy live on television.

== Personal life and death ==
=== Rock collecting ===
Loh was an avid rock collector and fossil collector, gaining an interest in the origin and identification of rocks while teaching in Malaysia in his 50s. He claimed that in picking up a rock, he saw "millions of years of evolution" which "[spurred his] imagination", and that it "[opened] up a sense of time which [he could not] get any other way." His role as a geology teacher also contributed to this interest, and he would often give lectures on the topic. In 1981, he expressed his interest in establishing a permanent rock collection at CJC and in contributing to a geological display at the Science Centre Singapore.

Loh organised his collection into boxes labelled by origin and country. His collection primarily comprised objects collected from local beaches, quarries and excavation sites such as the Sahajat Formation; a trip to Punggol Beach yielded what was reportedly "one of the oldest rocks in Singapore." He would also travel abroad with the intent of adding to his collection, which also included rocks from Malaysia, Taiwan, Philippines, Hong Kong and the western United States, so much so that he returned from his trip to Manila knowing "more about rocks and sands there than the Brothers living in Manila."

In 1983, he received a consolation prize in a competition to design exhibits for the Science Centre. The oldest entrant, Loh designed an exhibit on local rocks and soils.

=== Retirement and death ===
Loh was made a Justice of the Peace on 22 May 1979. In his final years, he was residing at the brothers' quarters at St. Patrick's School. He died of a heart attack in his room on 5 July 2001. When "persistent knocks" on his door failed to yield any response, the Brothers at St. Patrick's broke down his door. An ambulance was then called, and a paramedic pronounced him dead on the scene. The wake and funeral were held at the school on 6 and 7 July, respectively. He was then cremated at Mount Vernon. Loh was described in his obituary in The Straits Times as a "Catholic stalwart" who was remembered for his "tireless work in not only advancing the cause of Catholic missionary schools, but also in contributing to the social development of Singapore."
