= Murder of Saenphan Thawan =

2001 murder of a Thai drug ring operator in Singapore

Saenphan Thawan
- Born: Saenphan Thawan c. 1978; Thailand
- Died: 2 June 2001 (aged 23); Kian Teck Road, Singapore
- Cause of death: Murdered
- Other names: Yaou
- Occupations: Drug lord Pimp
- Known for: Murder victim

On 2 June 2001, at a vacant area in Kian Teck Road in Singapore, 23-year-old Thai national Saenphan Thawan was attacked by a gang of six Thai workers, after he had allegedly offended one of the attackers' girlfriend, who told her boyfriend about the victim's actions. Saenphan, who was the head operator of a drug trafficking and prostitution ring at Kian Teck Road, died as a result of the brutal assault, and out of the six killers, four of them were arrested and charged with murder, while the remaining two assailants remain on the run as of today. Out of the four captured, three of them were sentenced to death for murder and a fourth was given a jail term of nine years with caning (ten strokes) for manslaughter.

== Murder investigations ==
On 3 June 2001, hours after the police responded to a report that a fight had broken out at Kian Teck Road, a Thai citizen was discovered dead with a total of 38 knife wounds on his body, in addition to several head injuries, inside a vacant plot of land located at Kian Teck Road (located at Pioneer Road North). The victim was later identified as 23-year-old Saenphan Thawan, and the cause of his death was the head injuries he sustained from the alleged brawl that occurred in the same area the night before. Witnesses also told police that there were six young men armed with dangerous weapons who arrived at the area to fatally assault Saenphan, and they claimed that a dispute took place and it therefore sparked a fight that cost the life of Saenphan. About 30 police officers took part in a nine-hour search around the area. A sword and knife were later recovered by the police.

Aside from police investigations to arrest the six killers, further investigations also revealed that Saenphan (suspected to be an illegal immigrant) operated both a drug trafficking syndicate and a prostitution syndicate at the area of Kian Teck Road, where many Thai nationals would turn up and hang around for vice activities, including pimping and drugs. After the discovery of vice activities at and nearby the murder scene, about 254 people were rounded up by police during September of that same year in a mass crackdown on these vice activities.

As of July 2002, four of the six assailants were eventually identified and caught for the murder of Saenphan Thawan. The four young Thai men, identified as 19-year-old Dornchinnamat Yingyos, 33-year-old Thongthot Yordsa-Art, 28-year-old Seethong Phichet and Uthorn Koedsomboon (age unknown), were charged with murder between 2001 and 2002. To date, the remaining two attackers, who are still not identified, remains at large for the killing.

== Trial of Thongthot and Dornchinnamat ==
In January 2002, both Dornchinnamat Yingyos and Thongthot Yordsa-Art stood trial at the High Court for murdering Saenphan Thawan back in June 2001. At that point, both Uthorn and Seethong were not yet caught for their roles in the crime, and hence both Thongthot and Dornchinnamat became the first two to stand trial for the murder itself. Thongthot was represented by both Goh Aik Leng and Rajendran Kumaresan, while both Ram Goswami and Boon Khoon Lin defended Dornchinnamat. The prosecution was led by Ravneet Kaur, Sia Aik Kor and Paul Chia, and the trial was presided by Judicial Commissioner Choo Han Teck.

The trial court was told that two weeks before the murder, a Thai prostitute and Thongthot's girlfriend, Wena Awaburt, showed up at Kian Teck Road with a female friend over a personal debt. Allegedly, the victim Saenphan Thawan spotted Wena and warned her to not sell drugs on his turf and even threatened to rape and kill her should she ever showed up again, and being offended by the threat, Wena told Thongthot about the threat, and Thongthot, out of anger, decided to gather his five friends (including the co-accused Dornchinnamat) to attack Saenphan, and they armed themselves with swords, knives, metal chains and parangs as they went to the Kian Teck Road area, where they assaulted Saenphan in the full view of witnesses at the scene. According to an autopsy report by Dr Paul Chui, Saenphan sustained 38 stab wounds and several serious head injuries, and such that they were in the ordinary course of nature to cause death. Both Thongthot and Dornchinnamat gave defences that they never intended to cause death but only intended to teach Saenphan a lesson for his threats towards Thongthot's girlfriend, and the death was a result of a sudden fight between the six and Saenphan. As for Wena herself, she was arrested and separately charged with abetting the men to attack and inflict grievous harm on Saenphan, and she was detained at Changi Women's Prison as of April 2002.

On 25 February 2002, Judicial Commissioner Choo Han Teck delivered his verdict. He found that the common intent of the gang was to attack Saenphan and cause serious hurt to the victim, and this was proven by the fact that both defendants and their four accomplices were "fully and dangerously armed" when they went to confront Saenphan, assault him and therefore killed him. He rejected the claims of both Dornchinnamat and Thongthot that the death was a result of a sudden fight, because it was deemed as an undue advantage when Saenphan was outnumbered by his six attackers, all of whom were wielding weapons to injure him while he was unarmed, and therefore, the defence of sudden fight was rejected. Judicial Commissioner Choo concluded that by intentionally inflicting the fatal injuries on Saephan in furtherance of the common intention to cause him serious harm and for revenge, there were sufficient grounds to return with a guilty verdict of murder for both men.

Therefore, Dornchinnamat and Thongthot were both found guilty of murder and sentenced to death. Under Singaporean law, the death penalty was stipulated as the mandatory punishment for murder if found guilty.

In July 2002, both Dornchinnamat and Thongthot appealed against their convictions and sentences, but the Court of Appeal's three judges - Chief Justice Yong Pung How, Judge of Appeal Chao Hick Tin and High Court judge Tan Lee Meng - rejected the men's appeals, and upheld their convictions and sentences for murdering Saenphan Thawan. At that point, two of the other accomplices of the duo were arrested for their part in the crime itself.

== Trial of Uthorn ==
On 13 July 2002, Uthorn Koedsomboon, the third assailant to be arrested, was brought to court for killing Saenphan. Originally charged with murder, Uthorn pleaded guilty to a reduced charge of culpable homicide not amounting to murder, also known as manslaughter in Singaporean legal terms. After pleading guilty, Uthorn was sentenced to jail for nine years and given ten strokes of the cane. His trial took place two days before the fourth assailant arrested, Seethong Phichet, claimed trial for a charge of murder in relation to Saenphan's fatal assault.

== Trial of Seethong ==
On 15 July 2002, Seethong Phichet, the fourth assailant to be arrested, stood trial at the High Court for the murder of Saenphan Thawan, with Tan Teow Yeow and Chow Weng Weng representing him in court while the prosecution was led by Eddy Tham and Liew Thiam Leng. Seethong's trial was presided by Justice Kan Ting Chiu. In his defence, Seethong, who allegedly promised to bring the victim's severed head to Wena, argued that he was intoxicated by alcohol and was not in a clear state of mind when killing Saenphan, and he only followed Thongthot out of fear that Thongthot would assault him for not agreeing to join the attack on Saenphan.

However, Justice Kan, who delivered his full grounds of decision on 2 September 2002, rejected that Seethong was intoxicated by alcohol at the time of the murder, and also found that Seethong had voluntarily joined in the assault of Saenphan, with the knowledge that Saenphan would be killed and that he used the sword to hack at Saenphan's neck with an intention to decapitate the victim, which corroborated his intent to cause the death of Saenphan. Therefore, Justice Kan found Seethong guilty of murdering Saenphan and sentenced him to death, making Seethong the third perpetrator of the crime to face the gallows for Saenphan's death. After his conviction for murdering Saephan, Seethong expressed that he did not wish to appeal his conviction and death penalty for the crime. Therefore, Seethong's death sentence was finalized, and he was incarcerated on death row at Changi Prison, together with his two condemned accomplices Dornchinnamat and Thongthot, who both lost their appeals and likewise awaiting execution.

== Execution of convicts ==
On 21 February 2003, the three Thai condemned murderers - Seethong Phichet, Thongthot Yordsa-Art and Dornchinnamat Yingyos - were hanged in Changi Prison at dawn. Undertaker Roland Tay, who was known for arranging the funerals of Huang Na and Liu Hong Mei, helped to arrange the trio's funerals after their executions. The trio had also donated all of their organs as a last wish to help other people out of kindness before they were executed.

== See also ==
- Caning in Singapore
- Capital punishment in Singapore
- List of major crimes in Singapore
