= Death of Soh San =

2001 case of a lift robbery-turned homicide in Singapore

Soh San
- A IC photo of Soh San, who was killed in 2001
- Born: Soh San; 4 May 1973; Singapore
- Died: 2 October 2001 (aged 28); Bukit Batok, Singapore
- Cause of death: Fatal knife wounds to the chest and abdomen
- Education: National University of Singapore
- Occupation: Telecommunications company manager
- Employer: M1
- Known for: Murder victim
- Parent: Katherine Wong (mother)

On 2 October 2001, 28-year-old Soh San (Chinese: 苏姗; Jyutping: Sou1 Saan1; pinyin: Sū Shān), who was a manager of a telecommunications company, was found dead with her body stuck between the lift doors of her flat in Bukit Batok. She had sustained several knife wounds to her chest and abdomen. Soh's death remained unsolved for the next 12 years until a 28-year-old man surrendered himself and confessed to having stabbed Soh nine times during a robbery.

The suspect, Gunasegaran Ramasamy, was 16 years old when he committed the crime, and he had gone to jail several times for unrelated offences before and after the murder of Soh San. Gunasegaran was originally charged with murder, but he eventually pleaded guilty to a reduced charge of robbery with hurt. On 20 March 2017, 16 years after the stabbing, Gunasegaran was put on trial and sentenced to ten years in prison, and given 12 strokes of the cane.

== Murder investigations ==
A poster published by Soh's family, which contained an appeal seeking information from the public to arrest her murderer

On 2 October 2001, a resident surnamed Lim who lived at one of the flats in Bukit Batok discovered the body of a young woman wedged between the lift doors, with her belongings scattered all over the area. Lim reported the discovery to the police.

The victim was identified to be Lim's 28-year-old neighbour, Soh San, who worked as a manager of a telecommunications company. Soh lived in Bukit Batok with her mother and stepfather. She had one younger sister who was then studying in England, and she herself graduated from National University of Singapore and had a long-time boyfriend prior to her death. An autopsy report certified that Soh sustained a total of nine stab wounds to her arm, chest and abdomen, which eventually led to her death. Many residents were shocked to hear that a brutal murder had happened at their block. The area was cordoned for about six hours by the police, who investigated the case. This fear lingered until the next day, when none of the residents dared to use the lift where Soh had been killed.

The police classified the case as murder, and the probable motive behind Soh's murder was deduced to be robbery. The murder weapon was never recovered despite extensive searches made by the police. Soh's family also sent out posters to seek the assistance from members of the public to solve the case, which shocked the nation at that time. Soh's family were saddened over her death, and they also questioned why would the killer commit such a terrible and violent act on Soh. Soh's birth father once said that he reminded his late daughter to not resist when she faced a robber and comply to his demands, since he himself was also a victim of robbery. Soh's father identified Soh's body at the mortuary.

In November 2001, a month after the murder of Soh San, the Singaporean crime show Crimewatch re-enacted the case, and sent a public appeal for witnesses to help solve the case. Soh's mother also came on-screen to be interviewed and to seek public assistance to catch her daughter's killer.

However, the case remained unsolved for the next 12 years, until 2013, when a suspect surrendered himself and confessed to murdering Soh after he robbed her of S$30 in cash.

== 2013 arrest and re-opening of case ==
=== Arrest of Gunasegaran ===
Gunasegaran Ramasamy
- 2013 police mugshot of Gunasegaran Ramasamy, who was caught 12 years after killing Soh San
- Born: Gunasegaran s/o Ramasamy; 1985 (age 40–41); Singapore
- Status: Released
- Convictions: Robbery with hurt (2017); Methamphetamine consumption (2017); Theft (1998, 2000, 2002, 2006); Causing grievous hurt (2011); Breach of personal protection order (2011); Concealment of stolen property (2011)
- Criminal charges: Murder (2013); Methamphetamine consumption (2013); Causing grievous hurt (2011); Breach of personal protection order (2011); Concealment of stolen property (2011); Multiple counts of theft, robbery and burglary (1998, 2000, 2002, 2006)
- Penalty: Juvenile detention (1998 and 2000); Unspecified jail terms (2002 and 2006); Four years' imprisonment and six strokes of the cane (2011); Ten years' imprisonment and 12 strokes of the cane (2017); Eight months' imprisonment (2017; concurrent)

On 17 November 2013, a 28-year-old man walked into Jurong East Neighbourhood Police Centre, confessing to the police that he was responsible for the murder of Soh San. The man, a Singaporean citizen named Gunasegaran Ramasamy, was placed under arrest and charged with murder, leading to the re-opening of investigations in Soh's death.

Although the offence of murder carried the death penalty under Singaporean law, Gunasegaran would not face the gallows since he committed the crime of murder while he was below 18 years of age, and if convicted, he would be sentenced to life imprisonment and caning instead.

=== Gunasegaran's confession ===
After he surrendered himself, Gunasegaran confessed to the murder, and gave police the account of what happened. According to Gunasegaran's confession, on 2 October 2001, the date of the murder itself, Gunasegaran's sister gave him S$5 and asked him to buy instant noodles from a shop below her flat at Bukit Batok, which was in the same neighbourhood where Soh San and her family resided. Gunasegaran decided to make use of the errand as an opportunity to commit robbery, and he armed himself with a knife from his sister's kitchen. Gunasegaran, who was then 16 years old, walked to Soh's block and spotted her walking home from work.

Gunasegaran, who concealed the knife in his shirt, trailed Soh to the lift lobby, where he entered the same lift as Soh, pressing the left button before using his knuckle to quickly wipe away his fingerprint. Gunasegaran then took out the knife and threatened Soh, forcing her to hand over her money. Soh, who was attacked from behind and stabbed on the arm, gave Gunasegaran S$30 but the youth was dissatisfied and tried to snatch away Soh's purse. Soh resisted, which angered Gunasegaran further, prompting Gunasegaran to stab her on the arm and body before he fled, leaving the dying Soh behind. Gunasegaran ran down the stairs and returned to his sister's flat, where he cleaned the knife and returned it to the kitchen. He also tried asking his friends to help him flee Singapore but they ultimately could not.

Over the next 12 years, Gunasegaran went to prison thrice for other offences like robbery and assault, and his connection to the death of Soh was not detected by the police. Still, Gunasegaran felt an increasing sense of guilt and remorse, and was haunted by the fact that he killed a person. Eventually, he decided to surrender to the police for murdering Soh.

== Trial and sentencing ==
=== Reduction of murder charge and plea of guilt ===
In 2016, after they took into consideration that Gunasegaran had surrendered himself, the prosecution decided to reduce Gunasegaran's murder charge to one of robbery with hurt. On 20 March 2017, after standing trial at a district court, Gunasegaran pleaded guilty to both the reduced charge of robbery with hurt and one unrelated charge of consuming methamphetamine. The other charge of drug consumption was brought up due to Gunasegaran admitting to police that he had consumed methamphetamine, and his urine test results confirmed there were traces of the drug in Gunasegaran's urine sample. The charge of robbery with hurt carried the maximum sentence of 20 years' imprisonment with not less than 12 strokes of the cane, while the maximum penalty for consumption of methamphetamine was ten years in prison and a fine of S$20,000.

In his submissions on sentence, Deputy Public Prosecutor (DPP) Bhajanvir Singh urged the court to sentence Gunasegaran to ten years' imprisonment and 12 strokes of the cane, which was the maximum sentence that a district court can impose for the offence. DPP Singh stated that such a sentence should be given to Gunasegaran for committing an act of "senseless violence" against Soh. He pointed out that the robbery was premeditated and the brutality of the stabbing, and in summarizing Gunasegaran's case, he stated that the accused's actions demonstrated that he had no qualms about using violence without hesitation, and cited Gunasegaran's criminal record to support his case for a long sentence in Gunasegaran's case, given that Gunasegaran continued to commit other offences while he was then on the run for robbing and killing Soh.

Defence lawyer Ng Shi Yang, who was assigned to defend Gunasegaran, submitted in mitigation that the killing of Soh San was a result of a robbery gone horribly wrong, and Gunasegaran had been haunted by his conscience since the stabbing, and according to a psychiatric report, Gunasegaran kept hearing voices condemning him for what he did since the day he killed Soh, and even smelt blood on his hands at random moments. Ng also emphasized that Gunasegaran expressed genuine regret for his actions, which led to him finally surrendering himself to the authorities after 12 years of hiding the truth, and to face the music for what he did with hopes to allow Soh's family get closure and healing. Ng said that Gunasegaran had the choice to not surrender, and the Soh San case would have remained cold, and his decision to surrender allowed the police to finally solve the case.

=== Sentence ===
After receiving the submissions, District Judge Tan Jen Tse returned with a verdict, sentencing 32-year-old Gunasegaran Ramasamy to ten years' imprisonment and 12 strokes of the cane for the charge of robbery with hurt, and the jail term was backdated to 18 November 2013. A concurrent sentence of eight months' imprisonment was also imposed for the charge of methamphetamine consumption. District Judge Tan stated in his verdict that Gunasegaran had committed a very serious offence and there were several aggravating factors in his case, including the violence displayed by Gunasegaran during the robbery, which justified the sentence imposed in Gunasegaran's case. However, District Judge Tan also acknowledged Gunasegaran's young age at the time of the offence, and accepted that Gunasegaran was truly remorseful for murdering Soh.

After his sentencing, Gunasegaran was sent to Changi Prison, where he served his sentence of ten years with the possibility of parole after completing at least two-thirds of his sentence (equivalent to six years and eight months) on the condition that he maintained good behaviour in prison. Gunasegaran has since been released from prison.

== Fate of Soh’s family and aftermath ==
Soh's family eventually moved out of their flat in Bukit Batok and lived elsewhere in Singapore. A local Chinese newspaper, Lianhe Zaobao, revealed in 2017 that Soh's mother and stepfather had immigrated to Australia about five to six years before Gunasegaran's trial.

When Soh's mother, Katherine Wong (aged in her 60s as of 2017), heard about the arrest and trial of Gunasegaran, she stated that she was glad that Gunasegaran was willing to come forward to admit to his actions and face justice, even though he had the other choice of continuing to hide the truth. Wong said she had long forgiven the attacker of her elder daughter for what he did since the year she lost Soh, and had moved on by seeking solace in her Christian faith. Wong expressed some disbelief when she heard that her elder daughter was killed by a 16-year-old youth, who wielded a knife and stabbed her elder daughter even after he gotten the money from Soh. Soh's uncle, 62-year-old Myke Wong, stated that it was sick to stab a person nine times and said Gunasegaran deserved to be haunted by what he did to his late niece. He said Gunasegaran should be put behind bars for life for having viciously killed a person at the young age of 16.

A 2021 article from The Smart Local named the murder of Soh San as one of the nine most terrible crimes that brought shock to Singapore in the 2000s.

== See also ==
- Caning in Singapore
- List of major crimes in Singapore
