= Murder of Shankar Suppiahmaniam =

2001 murder of a detainee at Queenstown Remand Prison, Singapore

Shankar Suppiahmaniam
- 2001 police mugshot of Shankar Suppiahmaniam, who was accused of rape prior to his murder
- Born: Shankar s/o Suppiahmaniam c. 1982; Singapore
- Died: 10 August 2001 (aged 19); Alexandra Hospital, Queenstown, Singapore
- Known for: His murder
- Status: Died before trial
- Conviction: None
- Criminal charges: Rape and oral sex (nine counts)

On 10 August 2001, at Queenstown Remand Prison in Singapore, 19-year-old Shankar Suppiahmaniam, a detainee who was charged with raping two young girls, was found dead inside his remand cell. Shankar, who was pronounced dead in a hospital, was found to have been killed by one of his cellmates, who was also charged with rape in a separate case. The inmate, Kanesan Ratnam, confessed to the police that he strangled Shankar due to their arguments over hygiene issues inside their shared cell and his wish to die in the gallows after some suicide attempts. Kanesan was found guilty of murdering Shankar and sentenced to death after a three-day trial in February 2002. Kanesan did not appeal, and he was hanged on 10 January 2003.

== Murder and investigations ==
On 10 August 2001, at Singapore's Queenstown Remand Prison, prison authorities were alerted by a detainee that one of his cellmates was lying motionless and his body had turned cold. The officers tended to the detainee's cellmate, who was said to be not breathing but had a weak heartbeat. Dr Norkhalim Dalil, the prison medical officer, attempted to resuscitate the victim, but the victim was unresponsive and his pulse did not return. Paramedics, led by Lelawaty binte Abdullah, also arrived at the scene to tend to the victim, who similarly did not respond to resuscitation efforts, and he was subsequently taken to Alexandra Hospital for further treatment.

The detainee, identified as 19-year-old Shankar Suppiahmaniam, was pronounced dead at 10.19am, after Dr Soh Poh Choong and Dr Pauline Neow tried to revive him to no avail. At the time of his death, Shankar was held in remand for the abduction and rape of a nine-year-old girl on 10 October 2000 and was supposed to appear in court for trial on 13 August 2001. Shankar, then 18, was arrested for the case on 7 January 2001 and in total, he faced a total of nine counts of rape and oral sex, among which the charges also involved another young girl (whom he lured after allegedly posing as a policeman). Due to the fact that Shankar died before he could be brought to trial, the prosecution abated the rape charges against him.

On 15 August 2001, it was reported that one of Shankar's cellmates was arrested on suspicion of killing Shankar. At that time, the cellmate was held in remand for another case of rape, and he was arrested on 18 June 2001 for that particular crime (for which no details of the case were made public). On that same day, the cellmate, 35-year-old Kanesan Ratnam, was charged in court with murder. A 1989 newspaper article revealed that prior to the murder of Shankar Suppiahmaniam, Kanesan was previously sentenced to seven years' imprisonment and 24 strokes of the cane for robbing two people on knifepoint.

== Trial of Kanesan Ratnam ==
Kanesan Ratnam, who was found guilty of murdering Shankar

On 25 February 2002, Kanesan Ratnam stood trial at the High Court for one count of murdering Shankar Suppiahmaniam. Kanesan was represented by defence lawyer Shashi Nathan, while the prosecution was led by Amarjit Singh. The trial was presided over by Judicial Commissioner Choo Han Teck. As Singaporean law mandated the death penalty as the sole punishment for murder, Kanesan potentially faced the gallows if convicted of murder.

One of the prosecution's first witnesses was Panneerselvan Lallayah, a remand inmate who shared the same cell as Shankar and Kanesan. Panneerselvan, who was then held in remand for capital drug trafficking, testified in court that on the morning of 10 August 2001, he was escorted out of the cell at about 8.25am to receive a visit from his family, leaving Shankar alone with Kanesan. Panneerselvan said that when he returned at 9am, he noticed Shankar lying on his mat in a prone position, and asked Kanesan why did Shankar slept so early, and Kanesan replied that he did not know and went back to rest, and he acted normally. Panneerselvan, who checked on Shankar, found that he was cold to the touch and was motionless, and he thus quickly called for help. Panneerselvan, together with another man named Rajagopalan Tamilarasan, were both eventually found guilty of drug trafficking and sentenced to death on 4 October 2001; Panneerselvan and Tamilarasan were both hanged on 13 September 2002.

Another prosecution witness was Dr Gilbert Lau, the forensic pathologist who examined Shankar's body. Dr Lau testified in court that based on his autopsy findings, Shankar's cricoid cartilage was fractured and consistent with a compressive injury, which was caused by considerable force applied to the neck with a possible arm lock. Dr Lau also said that the cause of death was due to asphyxia caused by strangulation. Dr G. Sathyadevan, a government psychiatrist, stated that Kanesan did not suffer from any unsoundness of mind and was mentally fit to stand trial, in spite of his anti-social and suicidal tendencies and history of depression.

The prosecution also adduced Kanesan's confession as evidence to substantiate their case. In his confession, Kanesan stated that he spent three months sharing the same cell as Shankar, and during that time, he and Shankar argued on several occasions over the hygiene issues of their remand cell. On that particular day of Shankar's death, Shankar accidentally spilled some tea and yet he refused to clean up the mess, and retorted at Kanesan in the face of his demand to clean up. According to Kanesan's statements, he was angered at Shankar for not cleaning up and hence, he turned violent and wanted to kill Shankar. Another reason why Kanesan wanted to murder Shankar was because he had attempted suicide but survived on previous occasions inside the prison, and he therefore killed Shankar, so as to receive a death sentence for Shankar's murder and thus provided himself an easy way to die, and he took the opportunity to commit the crime while Panneerselvan was outside the cell. Kanesan also admitted in one police statement that he wanted to kill Shankar to punish him for having raped a little girl.

Through his statements, Kanesan recounted that after the spilled tea incident, Kanesan attacked Shankar while his back was facing him, and he did an arm lock on Shankar's neck, and it took about five minutes before Shankar became motionless. Kanesan later grabbed a towel and used it to strangle Shankar a second time. Afterwards, Kanesan proceeded to clean up the spilt tea, but he was still simmering with rage while doing the task, which drove him to once again strangle Shankar a third time with the towel. In a final act of fatality, Kanesan spent five minutes to smother Shankar using a blanket. Shortly after Kanesan completed the strangulation, Panneerselvan returned to the call and upon finding Shankar unresponsive, he alerted the prison officers of Shankar's condition, and it was soon after Shankar's death, when Kanesan finally approached a prison officer and confessed that he murdered Shankar, leading to his arrest and subsequent indictment for murder. This was thus the version of events that Kanesan recounted to the police and prison officers.

On 27 February 2002, the third day of his murder trial, Kanesan opted to not enter his defence and remained silent. He also instructed his lawyer to not make any representations. With the prosecution's case unrebutted and Kanesan's decision to remain silent, the trial, originally slated to last five days, went to an abrupt end after three days of hearing. Reportedly, in the courtroom, Kanesan called himself a "stone killer", meaning that he was not feeling sorry or remorseful for murdering Shankar. The prosecution, in their submissions, urged the trial court to convict Kanesan of murder as they put forward evidence that the death of Shankar and his injuries were consistent with Kanesan's admission to the crime, and describing Shankar's death as a "cold-blooded murder", they called out Kanesan for acting out of proportion by killing Shankar over a trivial matter of spilled tea and condemned his remorseless behaviour towards the death of the 19-year-old victim.

On that same day itself, Judicial Commissioner Choo Han Teck delivered his verdict. In his judgement, Judicial Commissioner Choo found that the prosecution had proven its case against Kanesan beyond a reasonable doubt, and determined that Kanesan intentionally strangling him using an arm lock, which directly caused Shankar's death as a consequence. Judicial Commissioner Choo also referred to Dr Sathyadevan's report, and accepted that Kanesan was not of unsound mind when he committed the murder, even though Kanesan did not raise a defence of diminished responsibility against the murder charge. He noted that Kanesan chose to remain silent, which also closed any other possible avenues of defence which Kanesan could partake to rebut the murder charge, and he drew an adverse inference as bound by the law.

Therefore, 36-year-old Kanesan Ratnam was found guilty of murder, and sentenced to death by hanging. Reacting with distraught to her brother's death sentence, Kanesan's 34-year-old sister told the press that she, Kanesan and one brother were orphaned after losing their parents at a young age, and they also went astray and stayed at juvenile homes as a result, and she lamented that her brother would not have been in this plight had their parents were still alive, although the sister noted that Kanesan did not have any behavioural or temper issues and never expected him to kill Shankar in a fit of anger as per his admission to the sister.

== Execution ==
After he was sentenced to hang, Kanesan waived his right to an appeal and never challenged his sentence or conviction, and hence his death sentence was finalized. On the Friday morning of 10 January 2003, 37-year-old Kanesan Ratnam was hanged in Changi Prison.

In the aftermath, a total of 19 people were executed in Singapore during the year of 2003. Out of these 19 people, five (including Kanesan) were put to death for murder. Kanesan was one of the few people (also including murderers Took Leng How and Oh Laye Koh) to be convicted and given the death penalty for capital charges after they chose to remain silent and not put up their defence.

Queenstown Remand Prison, where Shankar Suppiahmaniam was murdered, was eventually demolished in 2010 and went defunct since.

== See also ==
- Capital punishment in Singapore
