= Sintercom =

Internet community

Sintercom (Singapore Internet Community) was an Internet community launched by Dr Tan Chong Kee in 1994 with the objective of providing a platform for free flowing discussion on various national issues much akin to soc.culture.singapore in USENET where he was active.

== SBA incident ==
On 5 July 2001, before the general election, Dr Tan received a letter from the Singapore Broadcasting Authority asking him to register Sintercom under the ‘Singapore Broadcasting Authority (Class License) Notification 1996’ and explained that registration was a procedural requirement with the intention to emphasize the need for content providers to be responsible and transparent when engaging in Singapore’s political issues.

Dr Tan published the request on Sintercom and pointed out that he was required to sign a document as part of the registration process, taking on personal liability for all content appearing on the site, including all content posted by users in the public forum. He pointed out that such a requirement meant anyone can maliciously post something libelous on Sintercom, and he will technically be liable for such libelous comment, even if he was unaware of them.

He further pointed out that the content guidelines were vague enough that much of the already published content on Sintercom could be construed, if the Authority so desired, as contravening the guidelines. In which case, by registering, he will immediately be personally liable. The authorities may choose not to act immediately, but this will become a Damocles' sword hanging over his head, putting enormous pressure to self-censor in order to avoid potential problems. Nevertheless, he registered Sintercom as the authorities had demanded.

After registration, he sent already published content on Sintercom to the authorities, requesting that they make clear if any had contravened their interpretation of the content guideline. He also stated to the authorities that he will remove any content they find objectionable so as to comply with their regulation. He also quoted a clause of the regulation back to the authorities, where it stated that a webmaster must refer to the authorities if they are unsure about the acceptability of their content. The authorities refused to answer if any of the published content sent to them were acceptable or not.

Dr Tan again stated that the authorities needed to make that clear or it would be impossible for him to comply without erring on the side of caution and practice self-censorship. The authorities released a press statement claiming that Dr Tan had overreacted.

On August 20, 2001, Dr Tan announced that he would shut down Sintercom because the authorities had made it impossible for him to run Sintercom with integrity. Sintercom was founded to demonstrate that it is possible for loyal Singaporeans to speak openly about what they really think. Unfortunately this chain of events had shown that it was not possible to do. He specifically pointed out that if the authorities could refuse to answer questions on acceptability of published content, then it was not possible to comply with such a law.

He stated publicly on Sintercom that given such a situation, he could either continue running Sintercom and pretend everything is OK until he is charged for libel, or he could run Sintercom by practicing self-censorship, or he can close it down to show that it is no longer possible to claim that Singaporeans can speak openly about issues that concern them. He chose the last option.

== Revival ==
In Dec 2001, Sintercom was revived by an unknown 'New Sintercom Editor' at GeoCities and has since moved on to newsintercom.org.sg. However, the relevance of New Sintercom is questionable given the prevalence other alternative channels such as Tomorrow.sg and personal blogs.

== Editors ==
The former editors of Sintercom are as follows:

- Dr Tan Chong Kee, Founder, Chairperson, The Necessary Stage
- Ms Chang Li Lin, Public Affairs Manager, the Institute of Policy Studies, Singapore
- Ms Wynthia Goh
- Mr Harish Pillay
