= Murder of Lourdusamy Lenin Selvanayagan =

2001 murder of an Indian electrician in Singapore

Lourdusamy Lenin Selvanayagan
- Born: Lourdusamy Lenin Selvanayagan c. 1978; Thiruvarur, Tamil Nadu, India
- Died: 22 December 2001 (aged 23); Alexandra Hospital, Singapore
- Cause of death: Murdered by stabbing
- Occupation: Ship electrician
- Known for: Murder victim

On 22 December 2001, inside his rented flat in Singapore's Marsiling, 23-year-old Lourdusamy Lenin Selvanayagan, (Note: His name was also spelt as Lourdusamy Lenin Salvanayagan or Lourdusamy Lenin Selvanayagam.) a ship's electrician from India, was stabbed to death by one of his room-mates Arun Prakash Vaithilingam, (Note: His name was also spelt as Arunprakash Vaithilingam.) who was his 23-year-old colleague from the same workplace. Arun, who originated from Tamil Nadu, evaded the authorities for about four months before his arrest in March 2002, and he was charged with murder. Arun put up a defence that he stabbed Lenin during a sudden fight against the murder charge, but the High Court ruled that Arun had taken undue advantage over the unarmed victim by using a knife during the dispute, and therefore found Arun guilty of murdering Lenin, and Arun was sentenced to hang under Section 302 of the Penal Code. Despite the appeals from Arun and the international community against the death penalty, Arun was hanged on 3 October 2003.

== Fatal stabbing ==
Shortly after midnight on 23 December 2001, a male Indian national was rushed to Alexandra Hospital for treatment, after he was stabbed during an argument with one of his ten room-mates at a rented flat in Marsiling. Despite the resuscitation efforts of Dr Soh Poh Chung and his colleagues, the man was pronounced dead 35 minutes later at 1.02am.

The victim was identified as 23-year-old Lourdusamy Lenin Selvanayagan, a ship electrician who was a native of Thiruvarur from Tamil Nadu in Southern India. At the time of his death, Lenin shared the Marsiling rental flat with ten other Indian workers - Arun Prakash Vaithilingam, Bala Sundram Suresh Kumar, Selvaraj John David, Kaliamoorthy Nagaraj, Ganesan Siva Subramani, Sivapunniam Karthikeyan, Kandasamy Pulgamani, Vanamamalai Pillai Chithambarakttalam, Clement Raj Leo Antuvan, and Rajagopalan Palvannan - and he was said to have been stabbed at about 11.30pm on 22 December 2001, and a few of his room-mates helped send him to the hospital. Some of his room-mates spoke to the police and media that Lenin had a good relationship with his alleged killer, before they fell out over a dispute and it led to the stabbing, and the perpetrator happened to be one of the room-mates helping to bring Lenin to hospital.

Forensic pathologist Dr Paul Chui found that Lenin was stabbed once on the chest, and although it did not penetrate the heart, the single wound itself was sufficient in the ordinary course of nature to cause death, as the knife had slashed through both the main pulmonary artery and left upper pulmonary vein, which caused massive bleeding and Lenin died as a result of the severe loss of blood.

The police investigated the case, which was classified as murder, and as the facts emerged during investigations, it was found that the room-mate responsible for the stabbing of Lenin was Arun Prakash Vaithilingam, who was Lenin's 23-year-old colleague and an Indian national from Thiruvarur in Tamil Nadu, who also held a diploma in electrical and computer engineering. However, Arun disappeared shortly after sending Lenin to the hospital, and the police took efforts to track him down for further investigations. Arun remained in Singapore and hid from the police for about four months, until 18 March 2002, when Arun decided to use a fake passport to flee to Malaysia, he was arrested at the Woodlands Checkpoint, and Arun was subsequently charged with murder.

== Murder trial and sentencing ==
Arun Prakash Vaithilingam
- Born: Arun Prakash Vaithilingam c. 1978; Thiruvarur, Tamil Nadu, India
- Died: 3 October 2003 (aged 25); Changi Prison, Singapore
- Cause of death: Execution by hanging
- Occupation: Ship electrician (former)
- Status: Executed
- Conviction: Murder
- Penalty: Death

In the same year of his arrest, Arun Prakash Vaithilingam stood trial at the High Court for one count of murdering Lourdusamy Lenin Selvanayagan. Arun was represented by N K Rajarh and Parvathi Annanth, while the prosecution consisted of Ng Cheng Thiam and Francis Ng. The trial was presided over by Judicial Commissioner Choo Han Teck.

The trial court was told that on the morning of 22 December 2001 (the date of the murder), while Lenin and his room-mates (except for Selvaraj John David and Arun himself) were boarding a lorry to their workplace, Lenin complained that Arun was often late due to him using the toilet for one hour (John David was not working that day), and while one of the room-mates Rajagopalan Palvannan advised Lenin to be more discreet in his comments, Lenin did not take the advice well and a brief argument broke out between Palvannan and Lenin, before the rest of the workers on the lorry defused the quarrel. Afterwards, the day passed on without issue. Arun, who returned home at 11pm after a drinks session and completing his employer's task, got wind of the argument between Lenin and Palvannan, and Arun woke Palvannan up, wanting him to accompany him to confront Lenin about what he said earlier that day, but Palvannan told Arun to leave the matter be and wait until the next morning before approaching Lenin. However, the advice fell on deaf ears as Arun, who was adamant about the unsettled issue, went ahead with waking up the sleeping Lenin and confronted him. An argument broke out between Lenin and Arun, the latter who had armed himself with a knife before the confrontation, which jolted the rest of the duo's flat-mates out of their sleep. In the course of the argument, Arun stabbed Lenin in the chest. According to the flat-mates of Arun, some of whom testified for the prosecution, they tried to restrain Arun from attacking Lenin before the stabbing, and Arun was seen switching the knife from his restrained right hand to the free left hand, and in a stabbing motion, Arun plunged the knife directly into Lenin's chest and it resulted in Lenin's death.

Arun, who elected to enter his defence, stated that he did not plan or intend to kill Lenin. Arun said that he never intended to stab Lenin, and he never realized that the knife had gone into Lenin's chest while he was charging at Lenin after he freed himself from the restraints by his friends. Rajarh submitted that Arun had no intention to use the knife other than to frighten Lenin, as per what Arun told the authorities after his arrest and during trial, and while he was charging at Lenin, Arun meant to raise his right hand to punch at Lenin instead of stabbing Lenin with the knife in his left hand. It was also emphasized by the defence that there was a fight between him and Lenin over the matter in the morning itself, which led to Lenin to die during the dispute. Overall, the defences raised by Arun against the murder charge were one of sudden fight, and one of unintentional stabbing.

On 3 December 2002, after a trial lasting five days, Judicial Commissioner Choo Han Teck delivered his verdict. In his verdict, Judicial Commissioner Choo found that Arun indeed stabbed Lenin on purpose, and he stated that while it may be true that Arun's original intention of arming himself with a knife was just to threaten or intimidate Lenin, it was clear that when he stabbed Lenin, he intended to use the knife to cause grievous harm and it in turn led to Lenin's death, and Arun's decision to switch the knife from his restrained right hand to his free left hand before the stabbing was a telling sign of his intent to stab Lenin. Judicial Commissioner Cho also cited that Arun’s mental state at the material time was not affected by alcohol intoxication even though he had gone drinking prior to the killing.

Judicial Commissioner Choo also touched on the defence of sudden fight, and he stated that it was untenable due to Arun being the instigator of the fight, and he was armed beforehand. The judge also determined that the accused had an unfair advantage over the deceased, given that Arun's height was 1.9m and he was taller than Lenin, whose height was 1.6m, and aside from his bigger physical stature, Arun was also armed with a knife while Lenin was unarmed, and hence he cannot avail himself the defence of sudden fight, and it was not successful in rebutting his murder charge. Judicial Commissioner Choo also referred to the definition of murder under Section 300(c) of the Penal Code, which stated that a person was guilty of murder if he/she intentionally inflicted a bodily injury(s) that was sufficient in the ordinary course of nature to cause death, and based on the findings he made above and per the section's definition, Judicial Commissioner Choo concluded that there were sufficient grounds to return with a verdict of murder in Arun's case.

Therefore, 24-year-old Arun Prakash Vaithilingam was found guilty of murder, and sentenced to death by hanging. Under Singaporean law, the death penalty was prescribed as the mandatory punishment for murder upon an offender's conviction.

== Arun's appeal ==
On 17 February 2003, Arun filed an appeal against the death sentence and murder conviction, once again raising his defences of unintentional stabbing and of sudden fight. After hearing his case, the Court of Appeal's three-judge panel - consisting of Chao Hick Tin, Judith Prakash and a third unnamed judge - dismissed Arun's appeal and upheld both his conviction and sentence.

In a judgement dated 12 March 2003, Justice Chao stated that the trial judge Choo Han Teck was correct to convict Arun of murder, since Arun, whose right hand was holding a knife while being restrained by his friends, had switched the knife to his free left hand and subsequently plunged the knife into Lenin's chest, and it showed he had intended to stab Lenin, even if he only wanted to use it to intimidate Lenin in the first place, and it was entirely legal for the judge to convict Arun of a Section 300(c) murder charge, where it concerned an act of murder by intentionally inflicting an injury(s) sufficient in the ordinary course of nature to cause death, despite the absence of any intention to cause death. Arun's act of wielding a knife during his fight with Lenin, who did not have any weapons at the material time, was considered to be an undue advantage taken by Arun and hence, his defences unintentional stabbing and sudden fight were untenable, and the appeal was accordingly dismissed.

== Controversy and execution ==
After the Court of Appeal confirmed the death penalty in Arun's case, Arun's family members stepped up to appeal to the President of Singapore to grant Arun clemency, which would commute Arun's death sentence to life imprisonment if successful; Arun's father (an ex-serviceman) and mother (an employee of Tamil Nadu Electricity Board) pleaded to the President to show mercy for Arun, who was their only son, and stated his act of killing Lenin was not premeditated. Similarly, the Indian government and Indian civil rights groups filed appeals to the Singapore government for clemency in Arun's case, and one of the civil rights groups, People's Union for Civil Liberties (PUCL), cited that Arun was not a habitual offender and that a mitigating factor in his case was that Arun helped bring Lenin to the hospital immediately after the stabbing, and hence his sentence of death should be commuted to life imprisonment.

After receiving word of Arun's case, international human rights group Amnesty International officially filed a plea to the Singapore government to spare Arun from the gallows, and they cited that Arun should not be executed as he had killed Lenin during a drunken argument and he never had any intention to commit murder, and also pointed out Arun's testimony that he never realized he had stabbed Lenin, and his death sentence was imposed despite the eyewitness accounts of the fight. Amnesty International also added that the death penalty was discriminatory and it was more often imposed for people of disadvantaged backgrounds or of foreign nationality, and Singapore should abolish the death penalty. The last death row inmate to be granted clemency was Mathavakannan Kalimuthu, a 19-year-old youth who was one of three people found guilty of murdering a man during a gang fight, and his original death sentence was converted to life in prison by President Ong Teng Cheong, who accepted his clemency plea in April 1998. Mathavakannan was released on parole since January 2012 after serving 16 years out of his life sentence, while his two co-accused were hanged during the same year he escaped the gallows.

On 25 September 2003, Amnesty International received word that President S. R. Nathan rejected Arun's clemency petition, and his death warrant was also released soon after, scheduling Arun to hang on 3 October 2003, and even so, the international community continued to appeal to the Singapore government to review Arun's case and commute his sentence to life imprisonment, but the execution date was not deferred.

During the Friday dawn of 3 October 2003, Arun Prakash Vaithilingam was hanged in Changi Prison, a year and ten months after the murder. At the same timing, two more drug traffickers were put to death at the same prison. Arun was reportedly the 13th person executed in Singapore in 2003, and during the year of 2003 itself, a total of 19 people were hanged in Singapore, five for murder (including Arun himself) and 14 others (including Vignes Mourthi) for drug trafficking.

== Aftermath ==
In the aftermath of Arun's hanging, Amnesty International condemned the Singapore government for executing Arun, whom they stated should not be hanged for murder in spite of his lack of intent to cause Lenin's death, and described the death penalty as a cruel and inhumane punishment which often fell disproportionately and arbitrarily on the most marginalized or vulnerable members of society. The case of Arun's execution, as well as the controversial executions of Rozman Jusoh, Poon Yuen-chung, Vignes Mourthi, Thiruselvam s/o Nagaratnam and Zulfikar bin Mustaffah, were cited by Amnesty International to support the notion that the death penalty was discriminatory towards people of disadvantaged backgrounds. In response, the Singapore government stated that they meted out capital punishment only for the most serious crimes and it was an effective deterrent against crimes like murder and drug trafficking, and was crucial in shaping Singapore into one of the safest countries in the world to live, study and work, and refuted the facts laid out by Amnesty International as an act to "misrepresent the facts to advance its political campaign against the death penalty".

Arun's case was also used as a case study in relation to Section 300(c) of the Penal Code, under which Arun was convicted for the murder of Lourdusamy Lenin Selvanayagan, and his case was mentioned in addition to similar cases, where a person convicted of murder was said to have committed it by intentionally inflicting a fatal wound(s) on their victim(s), even in situations where the offender intended to cause a different type of injury but ended up causing the fatal wound that was not intended by the offender, and the courts affirmed that the fatal injury inflicted through their deliberate actions made these offenders (including Arun) guilty of murder under the law.

The case of Lenin's murder was considered as one of Singapore's high-profile cases of violence between foreign workers during the 2000s.

In 2010, Alan Shadrake, a British journalist, wrote about the execution of Arun in his book Once A Jolly Hangman: Singapore Justice in the Dock, which touched on the issues of capital punishment in Singapore. However, as the book contained severe inaccuracies and misleading allegations about the Singaporean judiciary. Shadrake was arrested in July 2010 and charged with contempt of court by the Singapore authorities upon his arrival in Singapore to promote the book. Shadrake was sentenced to six weeks' imprisonment and a S$20,000 fine by Justice Quentin Loh of the High Court, although Shadrake had two more weeks added to his sentence after he failed to pay the fine. Shadrake, who refused to show remorse for his crimes, filed an appeal but the Court of Appeal rejected it, and he was deported after his release on parole in July 2011.

== See also ==
- Capital punishment in Singapore
