= Maybank Tower (Singapore) =

Office skyscraper in Singapore

- Menara Maybank 马来亚银行大厦
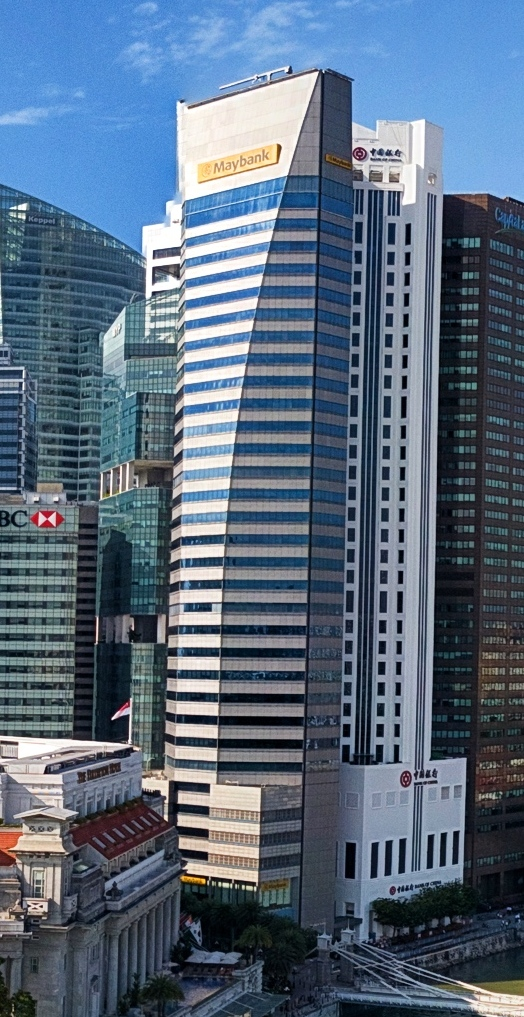
- Interactive map of the Maybank Tower area
- Alternative names: Maybank Chambers

General information
- Type: Commercial offices
- Location: 2 Battery Road, Singapore 049907
- Coordinates: 1.2859°N 103.8523°E
- Completed: 2001
- Owner: Maybank

Height
- Roof: 175.26 m (575.0 ft)

Technical details
- Floor count: 32 and 1 basements

Design and construction
- Architect: SYL Architects
- Structural engineer: T. Y. Lin International
- Main contractor: Eng Lim Construction

Maybank Tower is a 32 storey 175.26 m (575.0 ft) skyscraper and the current headquarters of Maybank in Singapore.

The building was completed in 2001, replacing the Malayan Bank Chambers building. When night falls, only the logo and the first few levels of the building are lit.

In mid-2008 two bright light stripes were added to the outer edges of the building from the ground to the roof. As the building is situated behind the national icon of Singapore, the statue of the Merlion, on Marina Bay, the building is often featured as a backdrop to the Merlion on local postcards.

== Architecture ==
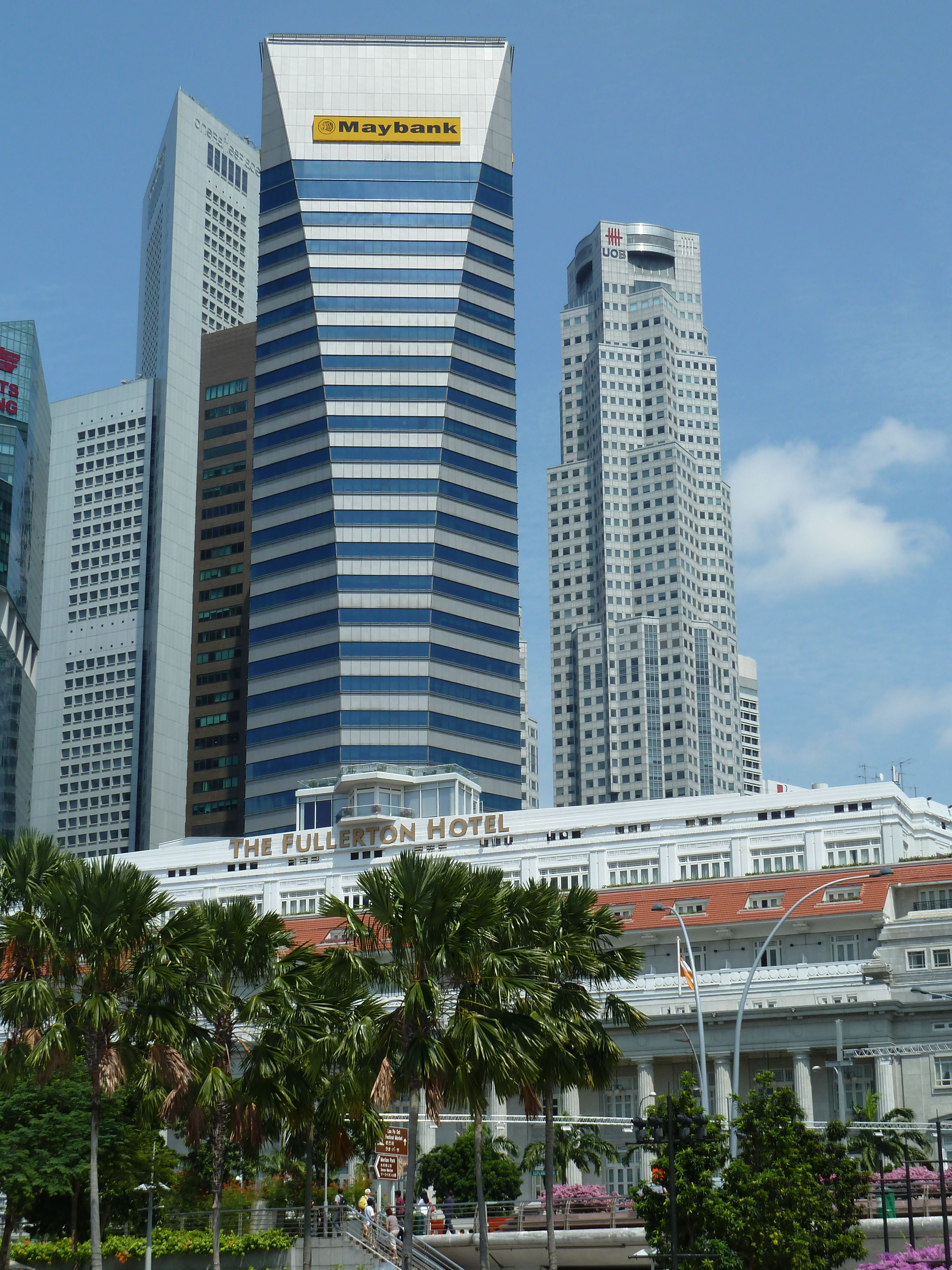
Alternate view from across Singapore river

The building features a 6-storey podium clad in granite and aluminium panels. The Tower tapers at the top where the bank logo is located.

The top is clad with double-glazed blue reflective glass and an aluminium curtain wall panel.

== 18 September 2010 fire ==
A fire broke out at Maybank Tower early on the morning of 18 September 2010, burning through two letters of the Maybank logo atop the building.

The bank's security guard was patrolling the building's surroundings along Battery Road at around 12.30 am when he spotted and reported the fire.

The Singapore Civil Defence Force (SCDF) put out the fire within 15 minutes by spraying two water jets from the rooftop. There were no injuries, and the cause of the fire at the 33rd floor where the Maybank neon sign is hoisted is under investigation.

Structural engineers have inspected the stainless steel frames that hold the neon sign and reported that the building is structurally safe, said a Maybank spokesman.

== See also ==
- Maybank Tower, Kuala Lumpur
- List of tallest buildings in Singapore
