= Harun Thohir =

Indonesian soldier

Second Corporal (Posthumous) Harun Thohir
- Born: Tahir bin Mandar; 4 April 1943; Bawean, Japanese East Indies
- Died: 17 October 1968 (aged 25); Changi Prison, Singapore
- Cause of death: Executed by hanging
- Burial place: Kalibata Heroes' Cemetery
- Other name: Harun bin Said
- Military career
- Allegiance: Indonesia
- Branch: Indonesian Navy
- Service years: 1962–1968
- Rank: Second corporal (posthumous)
- Unit: Commando Corps (Taifib)
- Battles/wars: Operation Dwikora; MacDonald House bombing
- Awards: National Hero
- Memorials: KRI Usman Harun (359); Harun Thohir Airport
- Criminal charge: 3 counts of murder
- Criminal penalty: Death penalty
- Criminal status: Executed by hanging

Second Corporal Harun Thohir or Harun bin Said (birth name Tahir bin Mandar; 4 April 1943 – 17 October 1968) was an Indonesian sailor born in Bawean Island, East Java, on 4 April 1943 to Mahdar and Aswiyani, while another source stated that he was born on 14 April 1943.

He was one of a three-member special forces team part of the Indonesian Marine Corps (the others being Usman bin Haji Muhammad Ali, alias "Janatin" and Gani bin Arup) who carried out the MacDonald House bombing in Singapore, during the Indonesia-Malaysia Confrontation, that killed three civilians. Following his capture, he was hanged for murder.

== Real and false names ==
Although his real name was Tahir bin Mandar, during the sabotage mission in Singapore, he used a false name, "Harun bin Said". The false name of "Harun bin Said" was given by Harun's team leader Captain Paulus Subekti.

== Early military career ==
Harun joined the Indonesian Marines in June 1964 and after five months training in Riau, he was promoted to lance corporal in 1965 and assigned to the Brahma Team I with Base II-A, in Riau, under the Supreme High Command (KOTI). The team leader was Captain Paulus Subekti.

The team was tasked to carry out sabotage operations against Malaya, now Malaysia, of which Singapore was a part, during the Indonesia-Malaysia Confrontation of 1963–1965. Harun was later stationed at Sambu Island, Batam, from where the team infiltrated Singapore on 7 March 1965 with 12 kilograms of explosives.

== MacDonald House bombing ==
Usman and Harun were instructed to bomb a power station by their superiors, but they were unable to accomplish that mission since their target was tightly guarded and proceeded to find an easier target—an office building crowded with workers and the general public in Orchard Road.

The team detonated a 12-kilogram high explosive, placed inside a blue traveling bag, inside the MacDonald House at 3:07 pm local time on 10 March 1965, killing three civilians, a Malay Muslim driver (Muhammad Yasin Kesit) and two Chinese women (Elizabeth Susie Choo Kay Hoi and Juliet Goh Hwee Kuang), who were office staff of a bank.

== Capture and conviction ==
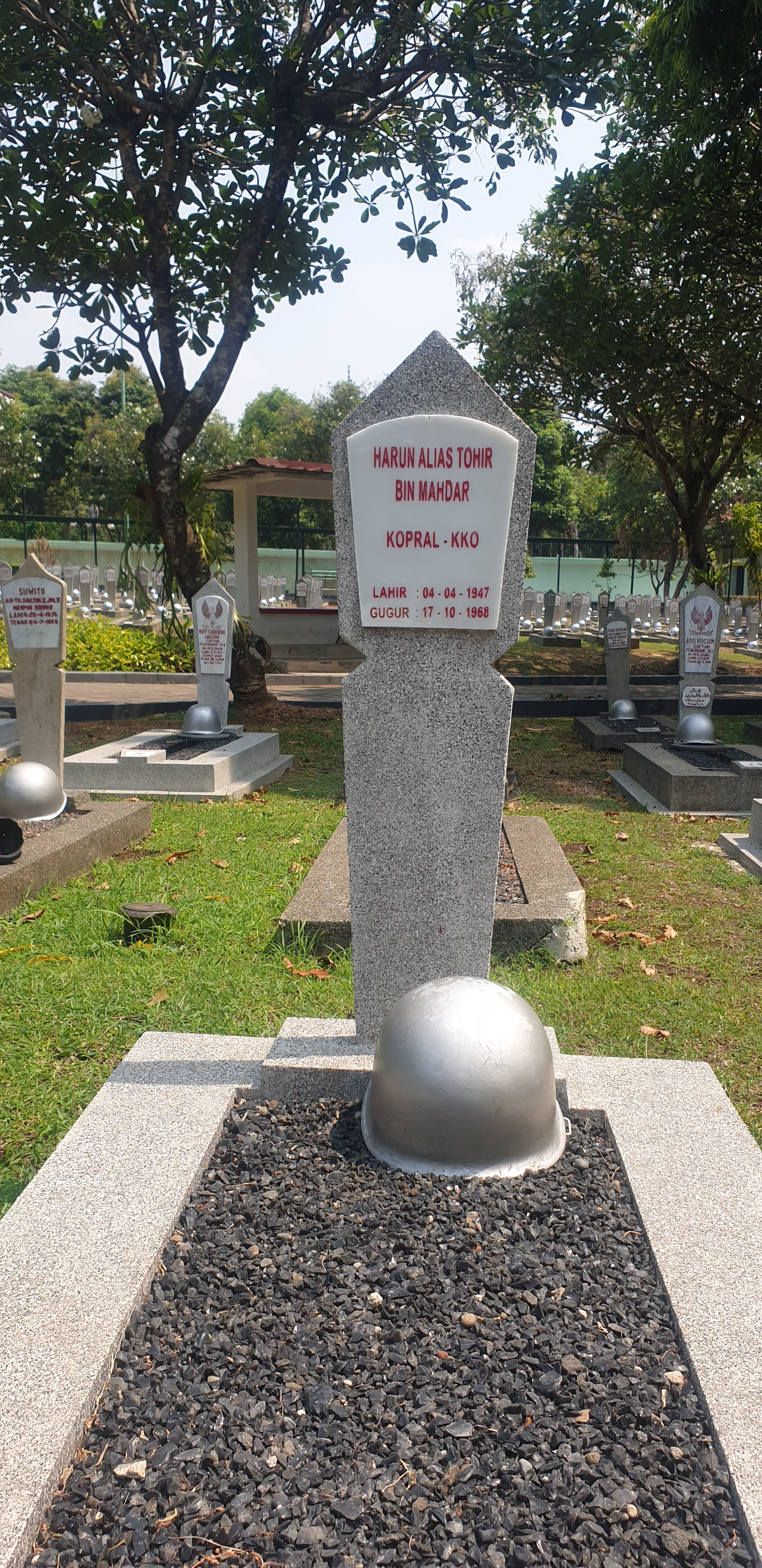
Grave of Harun Thohir

After completing their mission, both men tried to stow away out of Singapore on a cargo ship, but were told to get off after being identified as stowaways. They then stole a boat and headed out towards Batam. However, the boat either encountered an accident or sunk, as they were later found by a traditional cargo ship at around 8.00am, floating clinging to a piece of wood. Usman and Harun were transferred to a Singapore marine police boat, on 13 March 1965, where they claimed that they were a fisherman and farmer but later confessed to the bombing of the MacDonald House.

In court, both men were represented by Francis Seow, Senior Crown Counsel, who stated that they were "mercenary soldiers" and were paid S$350 (about US$280) to carry out their assignment. Usman and Harun were convicted of murder, as they had been wearing civilian clothes at the time and had targeted a civilian building, and were sentenced to death by a Singapore court on 20 October 1965. Their appeals to the Federal Court of Malaysia in Kuala Lumpur on 5 October 1966, and the Privy Council in London on 29 July 1968 were rejected. The two were hanged in Changi Prison, Singapore, on 17 October 1968. Their bodies were flown back to Jakarta, and buried in the Kalibata Heroes' Cemetery, Jakarta on 20 October 1968.

== National hero status ==
Both of them were honored as National Heroes of Indonesia by President Suharto through Presidential Decree SK Presiden RI No.050/TK/Tahun 1968, on 17 October 1968, the same day they were hanged. They were posthumously promoted to their next higher rank, Usman to the rank of sergeant and Harun to corporal.

=== KRI Usman Harun (359) ===
In 2014, an Indonesian Navy Bung Tomo-class corvette was named after Harun and Usman, the KRI Usman Harun. The name, however, caused controversy between Indonesia and Singapore, and the Singaporean government banned the ship named from berthing there or entering Singaporean waters.

=== Harun Thohir Airport ===
Bawean Airport, also known as Harun Thohir Airport, is located on Bawean island, Gresik regency, East Java. It was officially opened by minister of transportation Ignasius Jonan on 30 January 2016.

== See also ==
- Indonesia–Malaysia confrontation
- Usman Haji Muhammad Ali
- Capital punishment in Singapore
- MacDonald House bombing
