= Usman Haji Muhammad Ali =

Indonesian National Hero

Second Sergeant (Posthumous) Usman Haji Muhammad Ali
- Born: Usman bin Haji Muhammad Ali; 18 March 1943; Purbalingga, Japanese East Indies
- Died: 17 October 1968 (aged 25); Changi Prison, Singapore
- Cause of death: Executed by hanging
- Burial place: Kalibata Heroes' Cemetery
- Other names: Janatin; Usman Janatin
- Military career
- Allegiance: Indonesia
- Branch: Indonesian Navy
- Service years: 1962–1968
- Rank: Second sergeant (posthumous)
- Unit: Commando Corps (Taifib)
- Battles/wars: Operation Dwikora; MacDonald House bombing
- Awards: National Hero
- Memorials: KRI Usman Harun (359)
- Criminal charge: 3 counts of murder
- Criminal penalty: Death penalty
- Criminal status: Executed by hanging

Second Sergeant Usman bin Haji Muhammad Ali (18 March 1943 – 17 October 1968), also spelt Osman bin Haji Mohamed Ali, was an Indonesian marine and convicted murderer. He uses the aliases Janatin or Usman Janatin during his task of bombing the MacDonald House, which killed three people and injured 33 other people. Usman was executed alongside his accomplice Harun Said for the murders of the three deceased victims from the MacDonald House bombing.

== Early life and career ==
Usman Haji Muhammad Ali was born in Jatisaba, Purbalingga, on 18 March 1943. He graduated from middle school in 1962.

On 1 June 1962, he entered the Indonesian Marine Corps, and was appointed as one of three volunteers to serve in the military operation Komando Siaga (later renamed Komando Mandala Siaga), led by Air Force Vice Admiral Omar Dhani, during the Indonesia–Malaysia confrontation. Usman was later stationed at Sambu Island, Riau.

== MacDonald House bombing ==
Usman and Harun were instructed to bomb a power station by their superiors, but they were unable to accomplish that mission since their target was tightly guarded and proceeded to find an easier target—an office building crowded with workers and the general public in Orchard Road.

The team detonated a 12-kilogram high explosive, placed inside a blue traveling bag, inside the MacDonald House at 3:07 pm local time on 10 March 1965, killing three civilians, a Malay Muslim driver (Muhammad Yasin Kesit) and two Chinese women (Elizabeth Susie Choo Kay Hoi and Juliet Goh Hwee Kuang), who were office staff of a bank.

== Capture and conviction ==
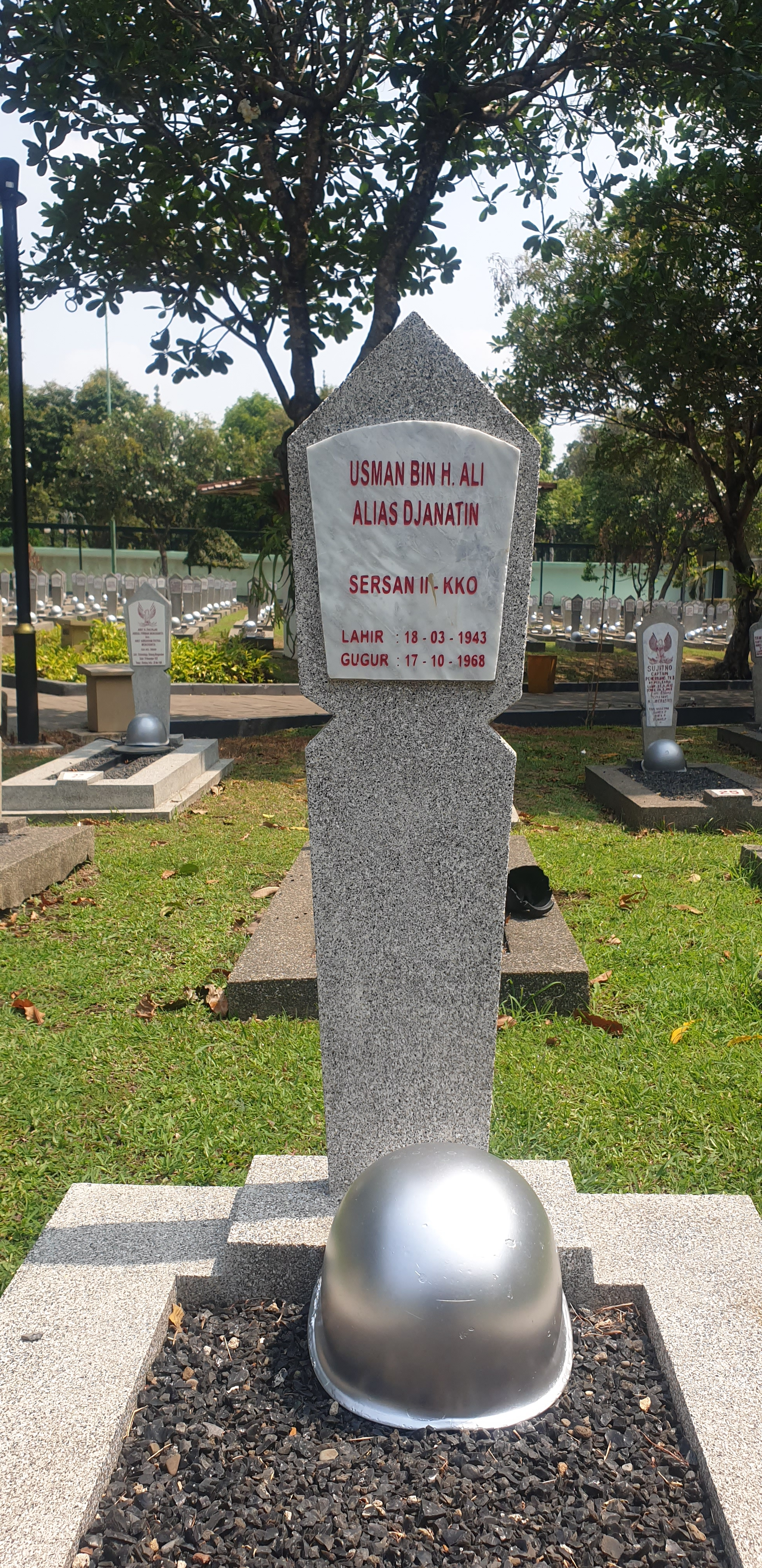
Grave of Usman Janatin

Usman and Harun subsequently escaped to a beach, while Gani disappeared and presumably returned to Indonesia. After seizing a motorboat, which broke down at sea, they were rescued by another boat and subsequently handed over to the Singapore Marine Police on 13 March 1965. Initially claiming to be engaged in fishing, they were however arrested and interrogated by the local police.

Usman and Harun were convicted of murder as they had been wearing civilian clothes at the time and had targeted a civilian building; both men were sentenced to death by a Singapore court. The two were hanged in Changi Prison on 17 October 1968. Usman's remains were taken back to Indonesia and buried in Kalibata Heroes' Cemetery, Jakarta.

== National hero status ==
They were awarded the status of Indonesian national heroes on 17 October 1968 (the same day they were hanged) and were posthumously promoted to one rank higher than those they held prior to their last operation.

=== KRI Usman Harun (359) ===
In 2014, one of three ships of the Bung Tomo-class corvette of the Indonesian Navy (initially built for Brunei but later sold to Indonesia) was named after Usman and Harun as the KRI Usman Harun (bearing the pennant number 359). The ship's name caused controversy between Indonesia and Singapore due to the bombing attack of 1965 and its immediate after-effects. Indonesia has not reversed its naming decision; in response, the Singapore government has banned the ship from entering its waters or docking in the country.

== See also ==
- Indonesia–Malaysia confrontation
- Harun Thohir
- Capital punishment in Singapore
- MacDonald House bombing

== Bibliography ==
- Komandoko, Gamal (2006). Kisah Seratus Duapuluh Empat Pahlawan dan Pejuang Nusantara (in Indonesian). Sleman: Pustaka Widyatama. ISBN 9789796610907.
- Ajisaka, Arya (2008). Mengenal Pahlawan Indonesia (in Indonesian) (Revised ed.). Jakarta: Kawan Pustaka. ISBN 9789797572785.
- Sudarmanto, J. B. (2007). Jejak-Jejak Pahlawan: Perekat Kesatuan Bangsa Indonesia (in Indonesian). Jakarta: Grasindo. ISBN 9789797597160.
