= Amber Mansions =

- Interactive map of the Amber Mansions area

General information
- Status: Demolished
- Location: Dhoby Ghaut, Singapore
- Coordinates: 1.2983°N 103.8466°E
- Construction started: 1921; 105 years ago
- Completed: 1928; 98 years ago
- Demolished: 1984; 42 years ago
- Owner: Joseph Aaron Elias

Design and construction
- Architect: Regent Alfred John Bidwell
- Architecture firm: Swan & Maclaren

Amber Mansions was a shopping centre and residential building located at the curve between Orchard Road and Penang Road in what is currently known as Dhoby Ghaut, Singapore. Constructed in the 1920s, the shopping centre was one of the first shopping centres in Singapore.

== History ==
The shopping centre was designed by Regent Alfred John Bidwell of the architectural firm Swan & Maclaren and was constructed somewhere between 1921 and 1928, being owned by prominent businessman Joseph Aaron Elias. Originally designed to be a fully-residential building, the centre cost over $400,000 to build, with the contracting work being undertaken by Soh Mah Eng, a frequent collaborator of Swan & Maclaren. The centre was three-storeys stall, and was, according to local architect Lee Kip Lin, "one of the best-designed post-World War 1 buildings in Singapore". The centre was popular with socialites and housed several boutiques, as well as the company City Developments Limited. However, the apartments of the centre experienced frequent burglaries in the 1940s.

In December 1978, the building had been gazetted for acquisition, and was taken over by the Urban Redevelopment Authority, along with the showroom of Cycle & Carriage and the Sri Sivan Temple. The buildings were demolished in 1984 to make way for the Dhoby Ghaut MRT station.
