= Harun Thohir Airport =

Airport serving Bawean, East Java, Indonesia

Harun Thohir Airport Bandar Udara Harun Thohir
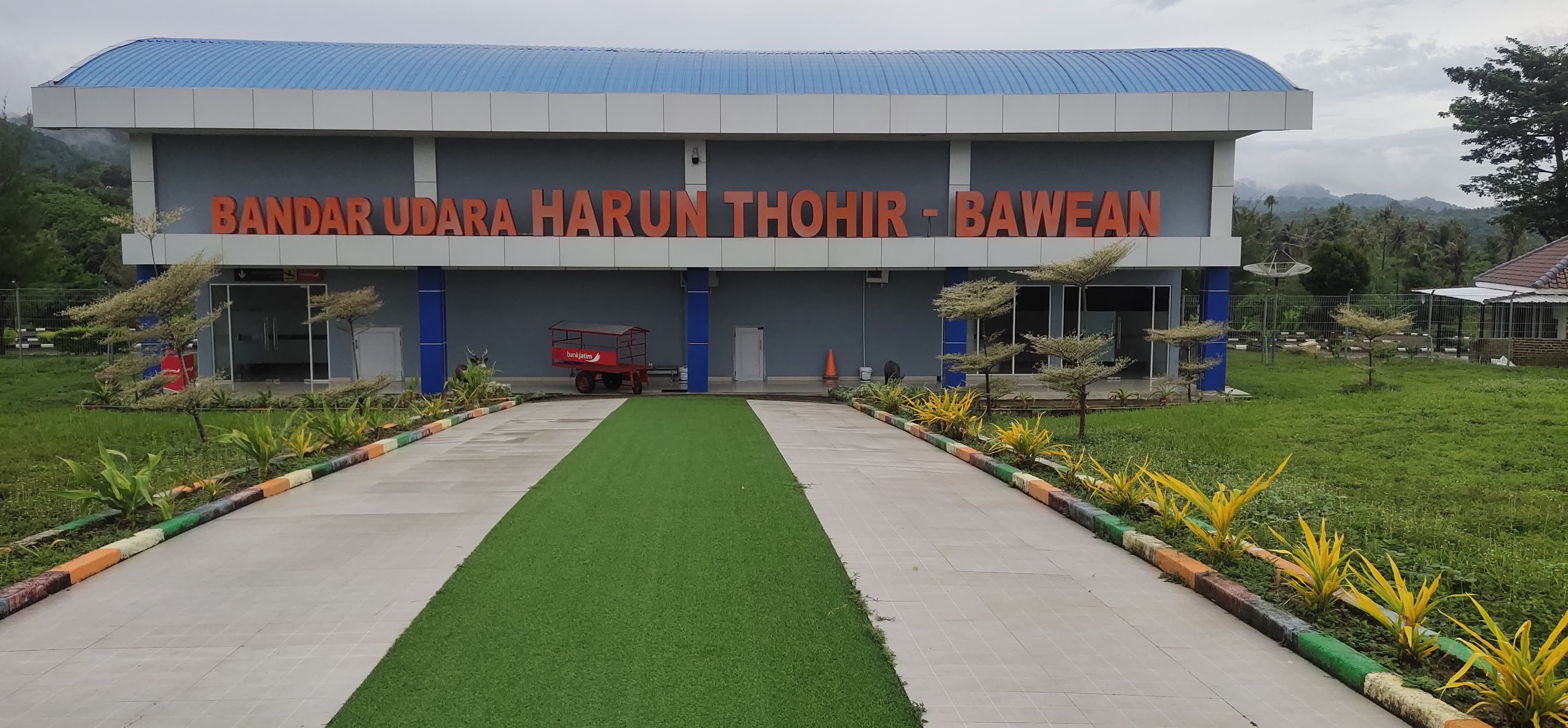
- IATA: BXW; ICAO: WARW

Summary
- Airport type: Public
- Owner: Government of Gresik Regency
- Operator: UPT Ditjen Hubud
- Serves: Bawean
- Location: Bawean, East Java, Indonesia
- Opened: 30 January 2016; 10 years ago
- Time zone: WIB (UTC+07:00)
- Elevation AMSL: 21 m / 69 ft
- Coordinates: 05°43′25″S 112°40′45″E

Map
- Location of airport in Java

Runways
| Direction | Length | | Surface |
| Direction | m | ft | Surface |
|---|---|---|---|
| 09/27 | 930 | 3,051 | Asphalt |
- DGCA

Harun Thohir Airport (IATA: BXW, ICAO: WARW), also known as Bawean Airport, is an airport serving Bawean, an island in East Java Province, Indonesia. The airport began operations in January 2016, and was officially opened by minister of transportation Ignasius Jonan on 30 January 2016.

== History ==
Construction of Harun Thohir Airport began in 2006. The airport was built to improve connectivity between Bawean Island and mainland Java, providing an alternative to sea transportation.

The first flight from the airport took place on 28 January 2016. Two days later, on 30 January 2016, Minister of Transportation Ignasius Jonan officially inaugurated the airport.

The airport was named after Harun Thohir, also known as Marine Corporal Second Class Harun Said bin Muhammad Ali, a national hero and native of Bawean who took part in the MacDonald House bombing during the Indonesia–Malaysia confrontation in 1965.

== Facility ==
Harun Thohir Airport is a Class III airport operated by the Directorate General of Civil Aviation. The airport has a runway measuring 930 x 23 metres, a taxiway measuring 90 x 15 metres, and an apron measuring 100 x 80 metres.

The passenger terminal has an area of 314 square metres and yearly capacity of 7,000 passengers.

== Airlines and destinations ==
The following airlines offer scheduled passenger service:

| Airlines | Destinations |
|---|---|
| Susi Air | Sumenep, Surabaya |
