= KRI Usman Harun =

Bung Tomo-class corvette of Indonesian Navy

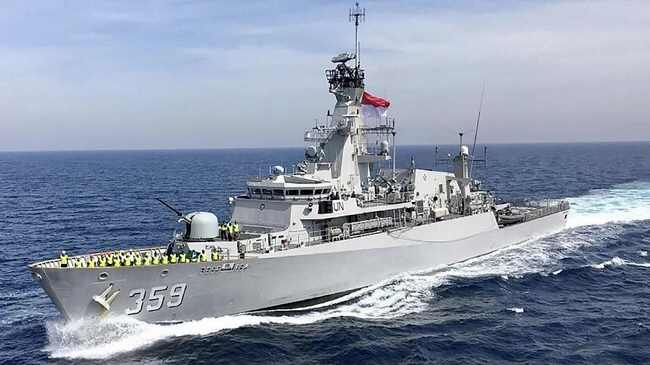
- KRI Usman Harun underway

History

Brunei
- Name: Bendahara Sakam
- Namesake: Bendahara Sakam
- Builder: BAE Systems Marine, Scotstoun, Scotland
- Launched: 23 June 2001
- Identification: Pennant number: 29
- Fate: Sold to Indonesian Navy in 2014

Indonesia
- Name: Usman Harun
- Namesake: Usman Janatin and Harun Thohir
- Commissioned: 18 July 2014
- Identification: MMSI number: 525014076; Callsign: PLJV; Pennant number: 359
- Motto: Sena Bhakti Duta Mangkara
- Status: In active service
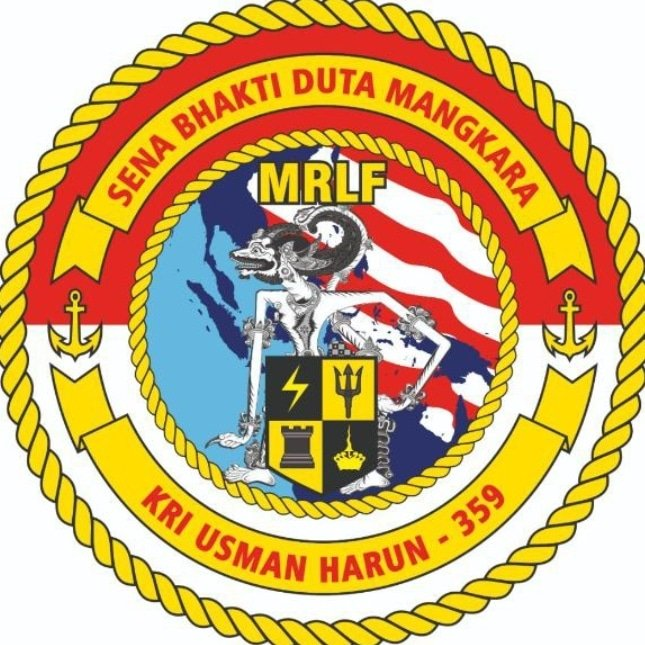
- Badge

General characteristics
- Class & type: Bung Tomo-class corvette
- Displacement: 1,940 tons
- Length: 89.9 m (294 ft 11 in)
- Height: 3.6 m (11 ft 10 in)
- Installed power: 11,400 hp (8,500 kW)
- Propulsion: 4 × MAN B&W / Ruston Diesel engines 2 × shafts
- Speed: 30 knots (56 km/h; 35 mph) maximum
- Range: 5,000 nmi (9,300 km; 5,800 mi)
- Endurance: 21 days
- Boats & landing craft carried: 2 × patrol craft
- Complement: 103
- Sensors & processing systems: Ultra Electronics / Radamec Series 2500 electro-optic weapons director; Thales Underwater Systems TMS 4130C1 hull-mounted sonar; BAE Systems Insyte AWS-9 3D E- and F-band air and surface radar; BAE Systems Insyte 1802SW I / J-band radar trackers; Kelvin Hughes Type 1007 navigation radar; Thales Nederland Scout radar for surface search; Thales Nederland Sensors Cutlass 242 countermeasure
- Armament: Guns : 1 × OTO Melara 76 mm gun; 2 × DS 30B REMSIG 30 mm guns; 16 Vertical launching system for MBDA (BAE Systems) Seawolf surface-to-air missile launcher (retired and planned to be replaced with VL MICA or Sea Ceptor); 2 × 4 MBDA (Aerospatiale) Exocet MM40 Block II missile launchers; 2 × triple BAE Systems Mark 32 Surface Vessel Torpedo Tubes
- Aircraft carried: 1 × helicopter
- Aviation facilities: Helicopter landing platform

KRI Usman Harun (359) is a Bung Tomo-class corvette in service with the Indonesian Navy. She was originally built for the Royal Brunei Navy and launched as KDB Bendahara Sakam in 2001. Usman Harun is the third ship of the Bung Tomo class.

== Class background ==
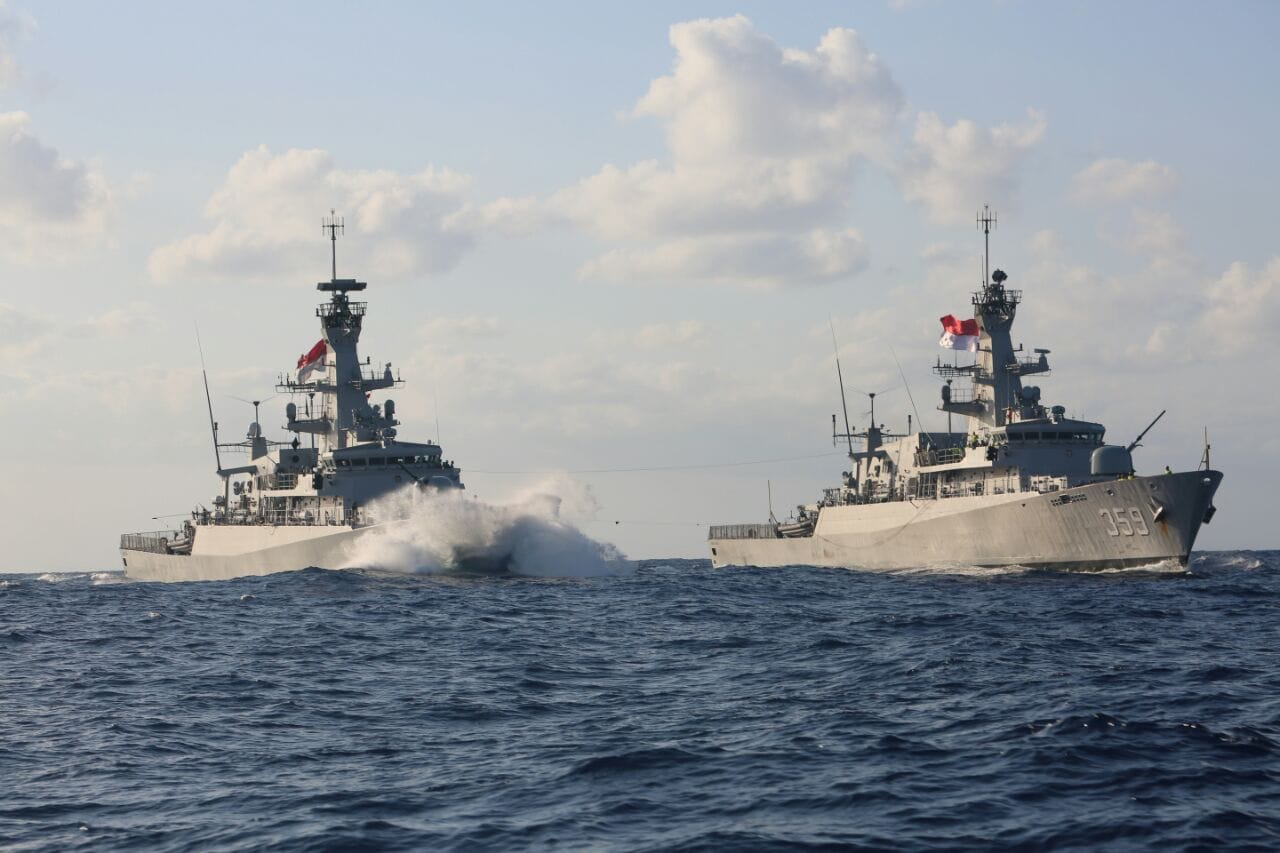
KRI Bung Tomo (357) and KRI Usman Harun (359)

The Bung Tomo-class corvettes are three vessels built by BAE Systems Marine (now BAE Systems Maritime – Naval Ships). The contract was awarded to GEC-Marconi in 1995 and the ships, a variant of the F2000 design, were launched in January 2001, June 2001 and June 2002 at the then BAE Systems Marine yard at Scotstoun, Glasgow. The customer refused to accept the vessels and the contract dispute became the subject of arbitration. When the dispute was settled in favour of BAE Systems, the vessels were handed over to Royal Brunei Technical Services in June 2007.

In 2007, Brunei contracted the German Lürssen shipyard to find a new customer for the three ships. In 2013, Indonesia bought the vessels for £380 million or around half of the original unit cost.

The ships were originally armed with MBDA Exocet Block II anti-ship missiles and MBDA Seawolf air-defence missiles. The main gun is an OTO Melara 76 mm; the ship also carries two torpedo tubes, two 30 mm remote weapon stations and has a landing spot for a helicopter. As of 2018, the MBDA Seawolf missile was out of service there was plans to replace it with the VL Mica.

== Construction and career ==
The ship was launched as KDB Bendahara Sakam on 23 June 2001, but never commissioned into the Royal Brunei Navy. Her original namesake is the Bruneian folk hero Bendahara Sakam, who took part in the Castilian War in the mid- to late 16th century. She was subsequently sold and commissioned into the Indonesian Navy as KRI Usman Harun on 18 July 2014. Her hull number 29 was changed to 359.

The Singapore government protested against the naming of the ship, as its namesakes Usman Haji Muhammad Ali and Harun Said had committed the 1965 MacDonald House bombing during the Indonesia-Malaysia confrontation, resulting in three deaths and thirty-three casualties. As they wore civilian clothes and targeted civilians, they were tried for murder and executed. The ship was subsequently banned from entering Singapore ports and sea bases, with the Singapore Armed Forces declining to partake in exercises involving the ship.

=== Deployments ===
In early January 2015, KRI Usman Harun was deployed to search for Indonesia AirAsia flight 8501's black boxes as the ship is equipped with the Thales Underwater Systems TMS 4130C1 hull-mounted sonar.

On 11 January 2020, KRI Usman Harun was shadowed by China Coast Guard ships 5202 and 5203 off the Natuna Regency.

On 10 March 2020, PT Len Industri (Persero) and Thales Nederland signed a contract for the Mid-Life Upgrade (MLU) of KRI Usman Harun. The upgrade aimed to modernize the ship's combat management, surveillance, communications, and navigation systems. The modernization programme was originally expected to be completed by the end of 2023. However, as of November 2025, the vessel remained under modernization and had not yet rejoined the fleet.
