= Bung Tomo-class corvette =

Ship class

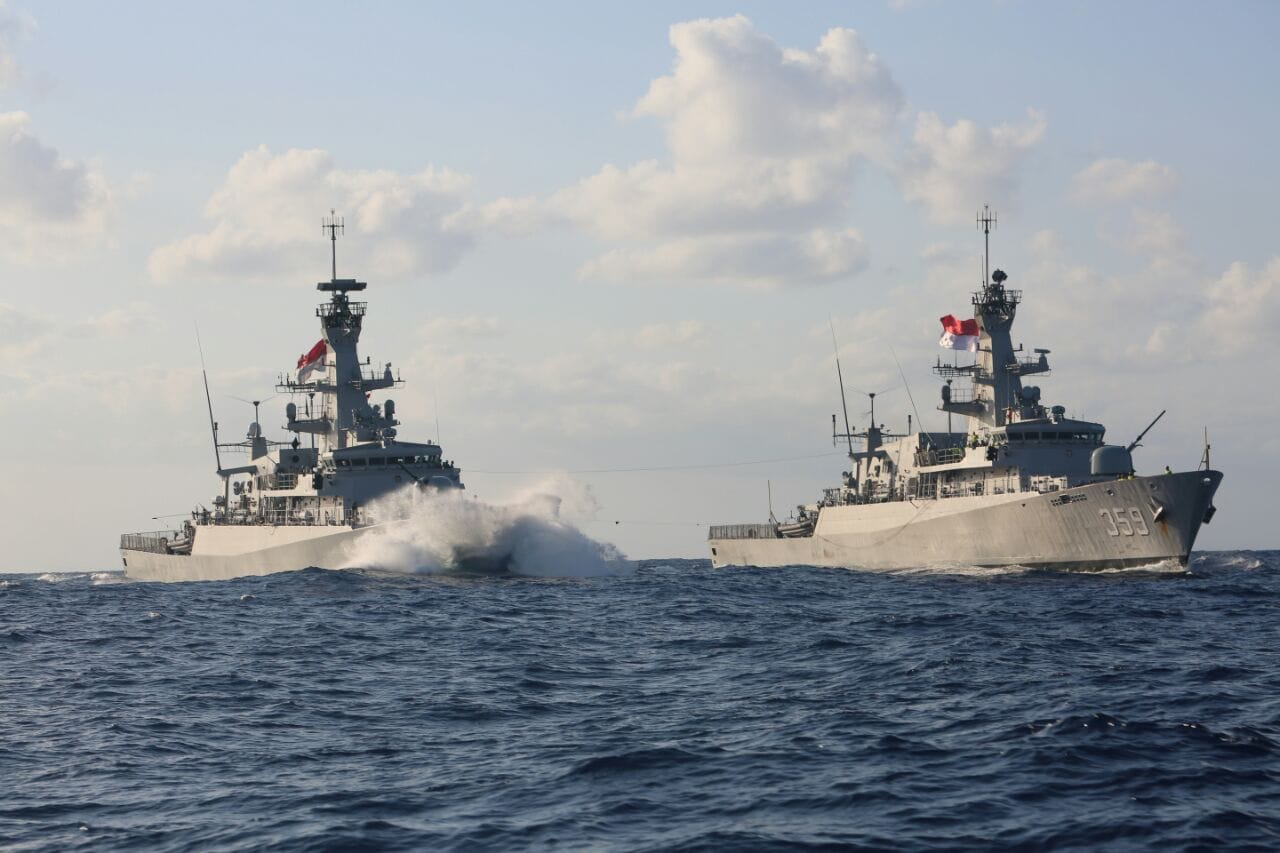
- KRI Bung Tomo (357) and KRI Usman Harun (359)

Class overview
- Builders: BAE Systems Marine
- Operators: Royal Brunei Navy; Indonesian Navy
- Preceded by: Diponegoro class (Indonesia)
- Succeeded by: Bung Karno class (Indonesia); Raja Haji Fisabilillah class (Indonesia)
- Built: 1998–2002
- In commission: 2014–present
- Completed: 3
- Active: 3

General characteristics
- Type: F2000 corvette / multi-role light frigate (MRLF)
- Displacement: 1,940 tonnes (2,138 tons)
- Length: 89.9 m (295 ft) LWL, 95 m (312 ft) LOA
- Beam: 12.8 metres (42 feet)
- Draught: 3.6 metres (12 feet)
- Propulsion: 4× MAN B&W / Ruston diesel engine (total of 30.2 MW (40,499 shp)); 2× shafts
- Speed: 30 knots (56 km/h)
- Range: 5,000 nautical miles (9,000 km) at 12 knots (22 km/h)
- Complement: 79 (space for an additional 24)
- Sensors & processing systems: Ultra Electronics / Radamec Series 2500 electro-optic weapons director; Thales Underwater Systems TMS 4130C1 hull-mounted sonar; BAE Systems Insyte AWS-9 E- and F-band air and surface 3D radar; BAE Insyte 1802SW I/J-band radar trackers; Kelvin Hughes Type 1007 navigation radar; Thales Nederland Scout radar for surface search; Thales Sensors Cutlass 242 countermeasures
- Armament: 1× OTO Melara 76 mm; 2× DS 30B REMSIG 30 mm gun; 16× VLS for Seawolf SAM (retired and planned to be replaced with VL MICA or Sea Ceptor); 2× 4 Exocet MM40 Block II/III missile launchers; 2× triple BAE Systems 324-millimetre (13 in) torpedo tubes, loaded with Italian A244S mod 3
- Aircraft carried: 1x Eurocopter AS565 Panther
- Aviation facilities: Flightdeck, no hangar

The Bung Tomo class is a class of three Indonesian multi-role corvettes or 'multi-role light frigate' (MRLF) bought from Brunei by Indonesia. They were originally built for the Royal Brunei Navy (RBN; Malay: Tentera Laut Diraja Brunei, TLDB), and named Nakhoda Ragam-class corvettes, but were ultimately bought by Indonesia and subsequently renamed. The class is named after Bung Tomo, a noted leader of Indonesia's independence movement.

== Background ==
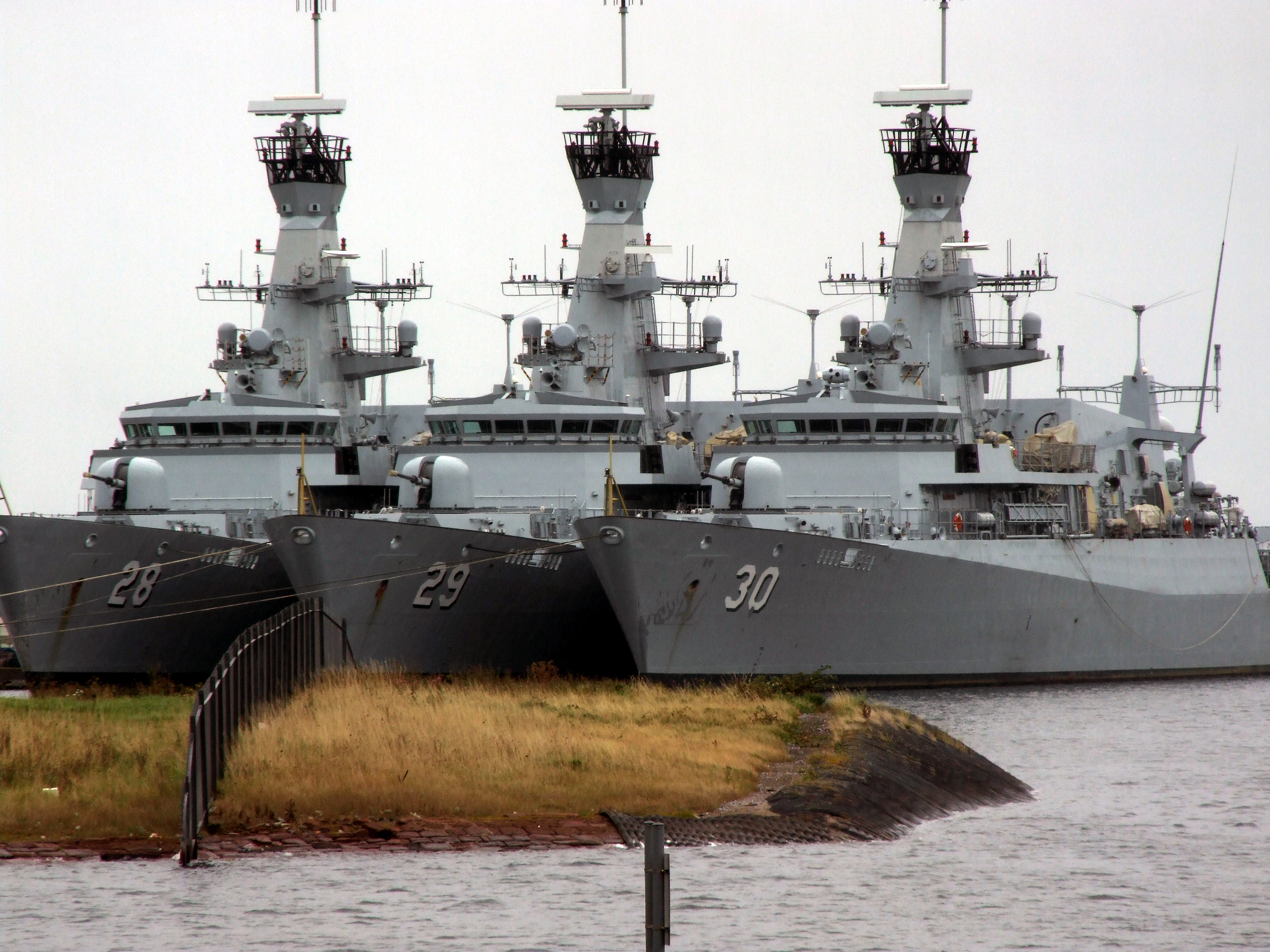
The Nakhoda Ragam-class ships in Barrow-in-Furness, 2007.

The three vessels were built by BAE Systems Marine (now BAE Systems Maritime - Naval Ships). The contract was awarded to GEC-Marconi in 1995, and the ships, a variant of the F2000 design, were launched in January 2001, June 2001, and June 2002, at the then BAE Systems Marine yard at Scotstoun, Glasgow. The customer (Royal Brunei Navy) refused to accept the vessels, due to claims by the Royal Brunei Navy that the ships fail to meet the required specifications; though opinion in the shipyard was that they were too complex for a small navy to operate. The contract dispute became the subject of arbitration. When the dispute was settled in favour of BAE Systems, the vessels were handed over to Royal Brunei Technical Services (RBTS) in June 2007.

In 2007, Brunei contracted the German Lürssen shipyard to find a new customer for the three ships. In 2013, Indonesia bought the vessels for £380 million, or half of the original unit cost. The ships are now in service with the Indonesian Navy.

The ships were originally armed with MBDA Exocet Block II anti-ship missiles and MBDA Seawolf air defence missiles. The main gun is an Oto Melara 76 mm. The ship also carries two torpedo tubes, two 30 mm remote weapon stations, and has a landing pad for a helicopter. As 2018, the MBDA Seawolf missile was out of service due to expired, and there was plan to replace it with VL Mica.

== Operational history ==
In late December 2014, KRI Bung Tomo was involved in search and recovery operations of the Indonesia AirAsia Flight 8501 which crashed off the Java Sea between the islands of Belitung and Borneo. Later in early January 2015, KRI Usman Harun was deployed to search for the black boxes as the ship is equipped with the Thales Underwater Systems TMS 4130C1 hull-mounted sonar. In late April 2021, KRI Bung Tomo was involved in the search for the then missing KRI Nanggala

== Ships of the class ==
KRI Bung Tomo is named after Sutomo, the leader of Indonesian guerrillas during the Battle of Surabaya. The naming of KRI John Lie memorialises the first Chinese Indonesian to be honored as National Hero of Indonesia, who was also one of the first high ranking navy commanders during the Indonesian National Revolution. The naming of KRI Usman Harun memorialises Harun Said and Osman Hj Mohd Ali, who were executed by Singapore after the MacDonald House bombing, creating a controversy between the two nations.

pennant no.	name	builder	launched	commissioned	status
357 (30)	KRI Bung Tomo (ex-KDB Jerambak)	BAE Systems Marine, Scotstoun	22 Jun 2002	11 Jul 2014	commissioned
358 (28)	KRI John Lie (ex-KDB Nakhoda Ragam)	BAE Systems Marine, Scotstoun	13 Jan 2001	18 Jul 2014	commissioned
359 (29)	KRI Usman Harun (ex-KDB Bendahara Sakam)	BAE Systems Marine, Scotstoun	23 Jun 2001	18 Jul 2014	commissioned

== Modernisation ==
On 10 March 2020 in Jakarta, Len Industri and Thales signed a contract for the complete modernisation of the Indonesian Navy KRI Usman Harun multi-role light frigate's mission system, witnessed by King Willem-Alexander of the Netherlands and Indonesian Minister of Trade Agus Suparmanto. This upgrade for the KRI Usman Harun is expected to be completed by the end of 2023, and it will considerably extend the service life of the frigate.

A final specification was drawn up, including Thales's TACTICOS Combat Management System, SMART-S Mk2 3D, and STIR 1.2 EO Mk2 radars, a Vigile Mk2 ESM, and two new tactical data links – Link Y Mk2 and a tactical data link that will be delivered by PT Len Industri, providing connectivity to Indonesia's military communications network and enabling the corvette to play its full part in wider naval task forces. The systems' commonality with those on other Indonesian ships would reduce training time and facilitate management and maintenance. Existing weaponry will also be fully integrated, and a new VL MICA surface-to-air missile system added; a significant boost for the vessel's air defence capability.

KRI John Lie received the new Exocet MM40 Block III missiles in 2023, replacing the older MM40 Block II, with the upgrade works started in 2022. KRI Bung Tomo also received the MM40 Block III upgrade in March 2024.

== See also ==
- Darussalam-class offshore patrol vessel – four ships later commissioned by the Royal Brunei Navy
- Lekiu-class frigate – two other F2000-derived ships built for the Royal Malaysian Navy
