= MacDonald House =

Historic building on Orchard Road, Singapore

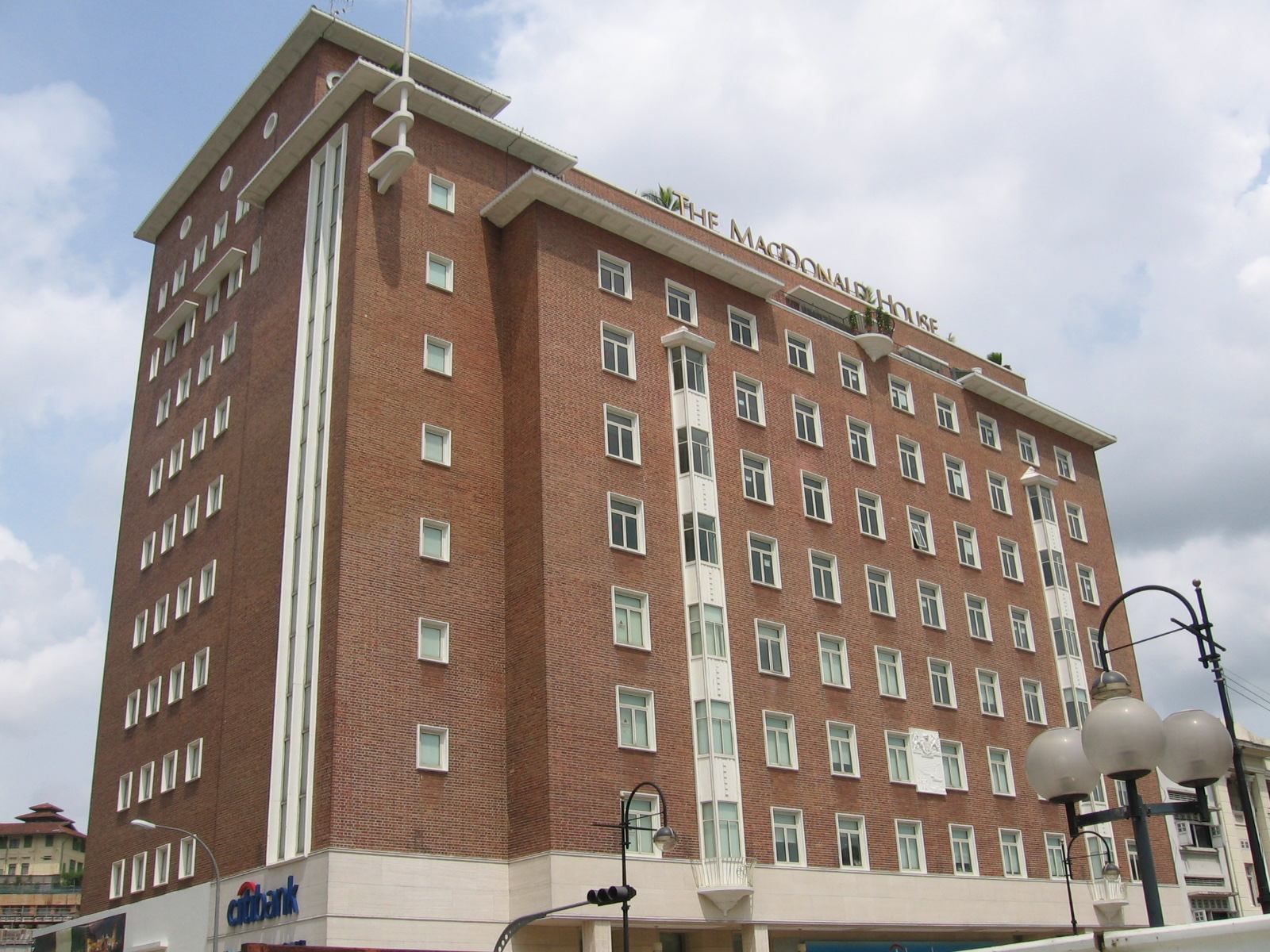

General information
- Status: Completed
- Architectural style: Art Moderne or modernistic
- Location: Orchard Road, Singapore, 40A Orchard Road, Singapore 238838
- Coordinates: 1.2992°N 103.8461°E
- Named for: Malcolm MacDonald
- Construction started: May 1947
- Completed: 1949; 77 years ago
- Opened: 2 July 1949
- Owner: HSBC (formerly); Tinifia Investment

Technical details
- Floor count: 10

Design and construction
- Architect: Reginal Eyre
- Architecture firm: Palmer and Turner
- Known for: Site of the MacDonald House bombing

Other information
- Parking: Yes
- Public transit: NS24 NE6 CC1 Dhoby Ghaut

National monument of Singapore
- Designated: 10 February 2003; 23 years ago
- Reference no.: 50

The MacDonald House is an office building in Orchard Road, Singapore. Built in 1949 as a branch for the Hong Kong and Shanghai Bank (HSB, present-day HSBC), it was the first building to be fully air-conditioned in Southeast Asia. Designed in the Art Moderne by Palmer and Turner, it was named after Governor General Malcolm MacDonald.

Land for the building was purchased by HSBC in 1946, with piling works beginning in May 1947. The foundation stone laid in November 1947 by MacDonald's wife in a ceremony. The building opened on 2 July 1949, where it was announced that it would be named the MacDonald House. On 10 March 1965, a bomb planted by Indonesian marines exploded in the building as part of the Indonesia–Malaysia confrontation (Konfrontasi), killing three and injuring 33 others along with damaging part of the building. HSBC put the MacDonald House for sale in April 2002, with the building was designated as a National Monument in February 2003. The building was sold to an Indonesian investor in 2003. MacDonald House reopened in April 2005.

== History ==
=== Construction and opening ===
Land for the building, which had a frontage of 140 feet (43 m) and a depth of 100 feet (30 m), was purchased by the Hong Kong and Shanghai Bank in 1946 after negotiating with Malayan Investments. In early May 1947, piling works for the building were announced to begin at the end of the month. 249 piles, with an average length of 35–40 feet (11–12 m), were to be installed by Sime, Darby & Co.

External images
- Photograph of the first pile driven into the ground by The Straits Times
- MacDonald House under construction by the Malaya Tribune
- Photograph of the opening ceremony by The Straits Times
- Photographs of the MacDonald House bombing on the National Archives of Singapore

Work on the building began in May 1947. The building's foundation stone was laid in a ceremony by the wife of then-Governor General Malcolm MacDonald on 22 November 1947. A copper cylinder, contained a balance sheet from 1866, photographs of the MacDonalds, copies of various newspapers, and Malayan dollar notes, was buried underneath the stone. By September 1948, it was reported by The Malaya Tribune that work on the MacDonald House is "making speedy progress", with its superstructure expected to be finished by the end of the month and concreting of the eighth floor in progress. It was also expected by the same month that the building would be ready for occupation by Chinese New Year. However, it was revealed in December that completion of the building was delayed by three months due to a strike in San Francisco, which affected the delivery of the air-conditioning equipment. The shortage of bricks also contributed to the delay.

In June 1949, it was announced that the MacDonald House will open on 2 July at noon. MacDonald House was opened by Malcolm MacDonald on 2 July 1949. It was reported by The Straits Times that more than 300 people, including government officials and figures in the commerce industry, attended the ceremony. His Master's Voice (HMV) Studio, (Note: The studio was later renamed to EMI Studio) set up by the Gramophone Company, was established in the building by January 1951, which is believed to have been the earliest instance of tape recording used in Singapore. The Australian Commission in Singapore moved its office from Robinson Road to the MacDonald House by September.

=== MacDonald House bombing ===
On 10 March 1965 at 3:07 pm, a bomb exploded on the mezzanine floor, instantly killing two and wounding 33. The bomb also partially damaged the building an estimated cost of $250,000; windows up to 9 floors were shattered, multiple inner walls caved in, and hole was created in the ground floor. A taxi driver, who was struck by the blast, died two days later after being in a coma. The bomb was planted by two Indonesian marines as part of the Indonesia–Malaysia confrontation (or Konfrontasi), a conflict between Indonesia and Malaysia over Indonesia's opposition to the merger of Malaysia. The marines, Osman bin Haji Mohamed Ali and Harun bin Said, fled Singapore three days after the attack but were later arrested by the Police Coast Guard. They were tried by the Court of Singapore on 20 October and sentenced to death for causing harm. The two marines were hung in Changi Prison on 17 October 1968 and their bodies transported back to Indonesia. The incident affected bilateral relationships between Singapore and Indonesia until May 1973, where prime minister Lee Kuan Yew scattered flowers on the marines' graves at Jakarta's Kalibata Heroes' Cemetery, which won the support of many Indonesians.

=== Post-bombing ===
In November 1981, HSBC set up an employee training centre in the building. By May 1990, improvement works for the MacDonald House were carried out. The Preservation of Monuments Board selected MacDonald House, along with the Cathay Building, to be conserved under Category 2 of the National Monuments act in November 2000. As part of the building's conservation, HSBC planned to renovate MacDonald House's interior; to do so, HSBC moved operations to the former Raffles Surgicentre building in Clemenceau Avenue at the end of June, and leased the building for two years. HSBC put the MacDonald House on sale in April 2002, with market observers expecting the building to be sold for S$47 million (2002) (US$26.25 million) to S$55 million (2002) (US$30.72 million). The building was gazetted as a national monument by the Preservation of Monuments Board on 10 February 2003, with the exterior façade coming under protection. HSBC sold MacDonald House to a low-profile Indonesian investor in August 2003, who bidded S$36 million (2003) (US$20.66 million). The building re-opened in April 2005 with full occupancy. McCann Worldgroup occupies the fifth to eighth floors while a beauty/spa operator, Expressions International, takes up the top two floors. The flagship Orchard Road Branch of Citibank Singapore opened on 23 June 2005, occupying 37,000 square feet (3,400 m^{2}) of space spread over the building's lower four floors. The branch later closed by February 2020.

== Architecture ==
External media
- Artist's impression of the building
- Artist's impression of the entrance

Designed by Reginal Eyre of the architectural firm Palmer and Turner, the MacDonald House is one of Palmer and Turner's first buildings in Singapore, and was built for The Hongkong and Shanghai Banking Corporation. It was the first large office building of the post-war period.

The building was built in a Moderne style. It is a reinforced concrete framed structure and clad in light red brickwork of fine detail, the last major building of its kind in downtown Singapore. It was the first building to be fully air-conditioned in Southeast Asia. In addition to the ground banking hall, seven floors of staff flats occupied the building. An open well runs through the building, allowing natural light into the inner offices. There are six skylights in the ceiling of the banking hall which thus needs no artificial lighting during the day. Various types of marble have been used in the building, such as carra white for the steps and travertine onyx for the columns at the entrance.

== Legacy ==
As the first building to be fully air-conditioned in Southeast Asia, it led the way for other buildings to be designed as fully air-conditioned. It was also the first major postwar development. The building housed EMI's recording studios, used by local bands during the 'pop yeh-yeh' period. Before the building was vacated in the early 2000s, the building housed HSBC on the first few floors of the building. One of the first high-rise buildings in Orchard Road, the MacDonald House housed mainly British, American and Australian companies.

== Bibliography ==
- National Heritage Board (2002), Singapore's 100 Historic Places, Archipelago Press, ISBN 981-4068-23-3
- Norman Edwards and Peter Keys (1996), Singapore – A Guide to Buildings, Streets and Places, Times Books International, ISBN 981-204-781-6
- Rashiwala, Kalpana Khattar Wong to move into MacDonald House: sources The Business Times 24 February 2005
