= Dhoby Ghaut MRT station =

Mass Rapid Transit station in Singapore

Dhoby Ghaut NS24 NE6 CC1 多美歌 தோபி காட்
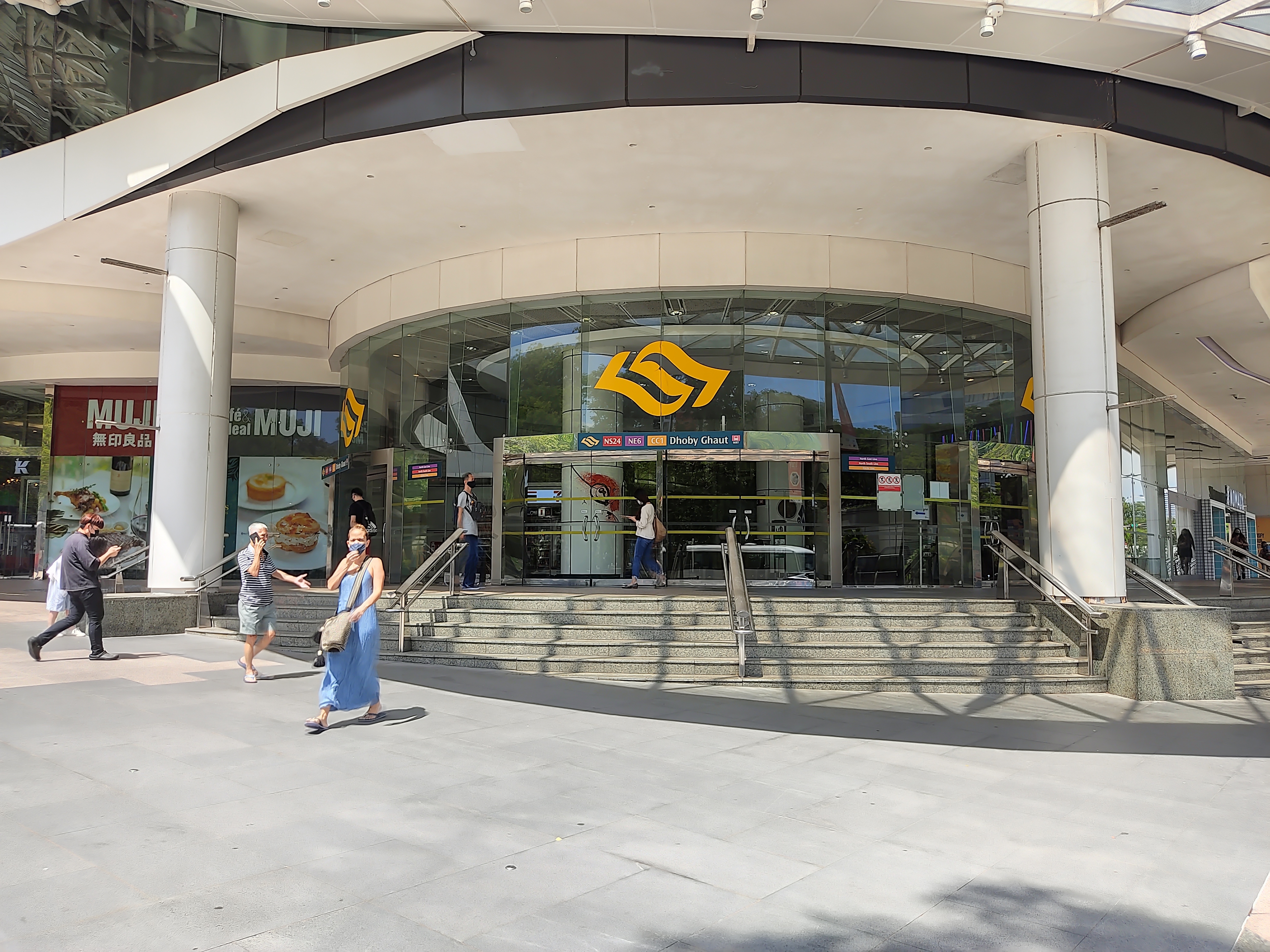
- Exit E of Dhoby Ghaut MRT station

General information
- Location: 11 Orchard Road, Singapore 238826 (NSL); 13 Orchard Road, Singapore 238893 (CCL); 60 Orchard Road, Singapore 238889 (NEL)
- Coordinates: 01°17′58″N 103°50′42″E
- System: Mass Rapid Transit (MRT) interchange and terminus
- Owner: Land Transport Authority
- Operator: SMRT Trains (North–South and Circle Lines); SBS Transit (North East Line)
- Line: North–South Line North East Line Circle Line
- Platforms: 6 (3 island platforms)
- Tracks: 6
- Connections: Bus, Taxi

Construction
- Structure type: Underground
- Depth: 28 metres (92 ft)
- Platform levels: 3
- Cycle facilities: No
- Accessible: Yes

History
- Opened: 12 December 1987; 38 years ago (North–South Line); 20 June 2003; 23 years ago (North East Line); 17 April 2010; 16 years ago (Circle Line)

Passengers
- June 2024: 30,224 per day

Services
Preceding station	Mass Rapid Transit	Following station
Somerset towards Jurong East	North–South Line	City Hall towards Marina South Pier
Clarke Quay towards HarbourFront	North East Line	Little India towards Punggol Coast
Terminus	Circle Line	Bras Basah towards Prince Edward Road
Track layout
Location
- Location within Singapore Rail central area

Dhoby Ghaut MRT station is an underground Mass Rapid Transit (MRT) interchange station on the North–South (NSL), North East (NEL) and Circle (CCL) lines in Singapore. Located beneath the eastern end of Orchard Road shopping belt in Dhoby Ghaut, Museum Planning Area, the station is integrated with the commercial development The Atrium@Orchard. The station is near landmarks such as The Istana, the MacDonald House, Plaza Singapura and Dhoby Ghaut Green.

Dhoby Ghaut station was part of the early plans for the original MRT network since 1982. It was constructed as part of Phase I of the MRT network which was completed in 1987. Following the network's operational split, the station has been served by the North–South Line since 1989. To construct the North East Line platforms, which were completed in 2003, the Stamford Canal had to be diverted while excavating through part of Mount Sophia. The Circle Line platforms opened in 2010 along with Stages 1 and 2 of the line.

Dhoby Ghaut station is one of the deepest and largest stations, with five underground levels. Its deepest point is at 28 metres (92 ft) below ground. The station features many forms of artworks, three of them under the Art-in-Transit scheme in the North East Line and Circle Line stations, a set of Art Seats at the Circle Line platforms, and an art piece above the North–South Line platforms. It is also the first triple-line interchange station on the MRT network.

== History ==
=== North–South Line (NSL) station ===
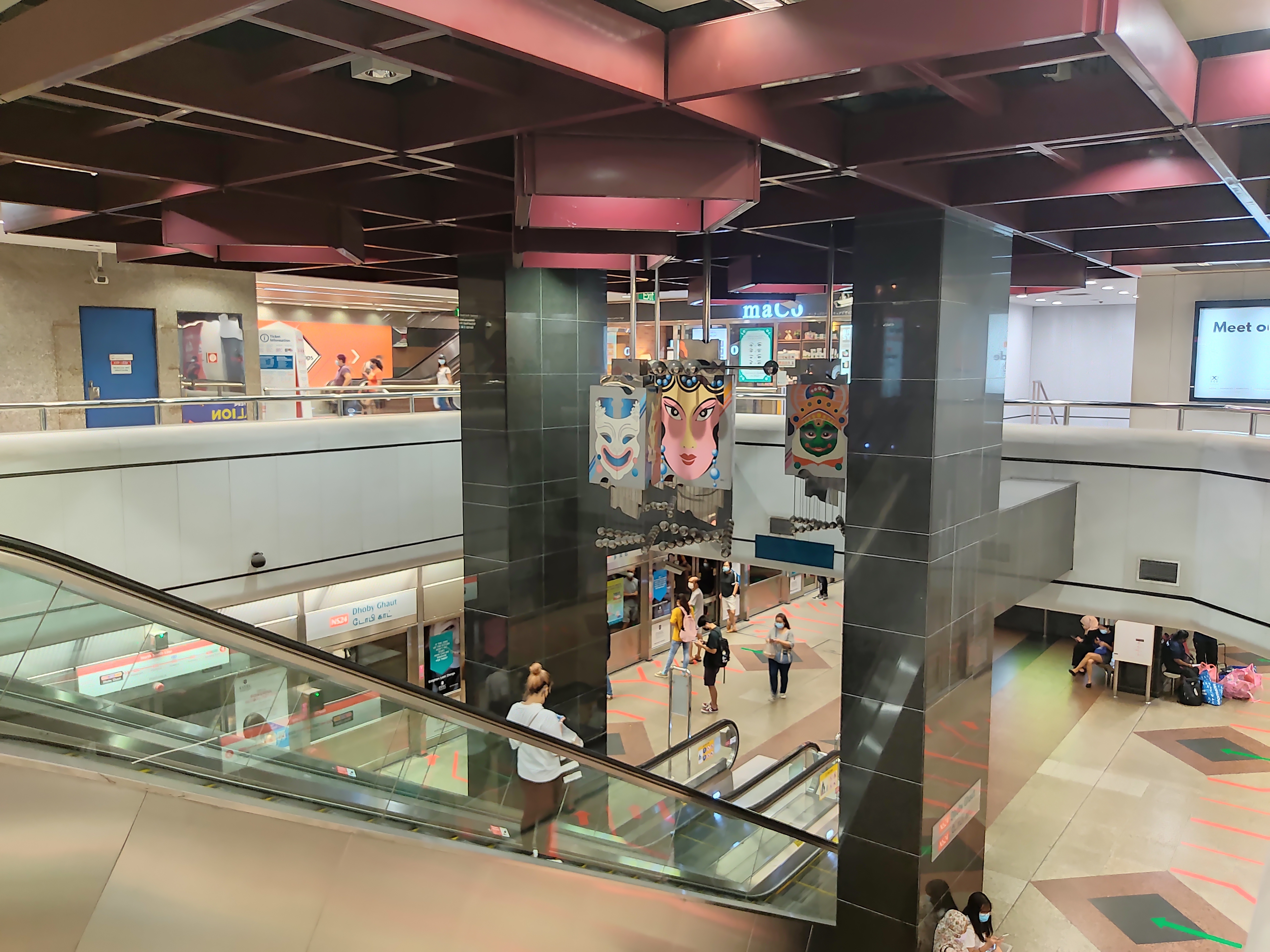
NSL platforms

Dhoby Ghaut station was included in the early plans of the MRT network in May 1982. It was to be constructed as part of the Phase I MRT segment from the Novena to Outram Park station; this segment was targeted to be completed by December 1987. Phase I, which would be part of the North–South Line (NSL), was given priority as it passes through areas having a higher demand for public transport, such as the densely populated housing estates of Toa Payoh and Ang Mo Kio and the Central Area. The line was aimed to relieve the traffic congestion on the Thomson–Sembawang road corridor.

Before construction began, tenants of Amber Mansions (Note: A three-storey shopping centre located along Orchard Road.) were compelled to relocate; the land had already been marked for acquisition in 1978. Contract 106 for the design and construction of Dhoby Ghaut NSL station was awarded to a joint venture between French contractor Campenon-Bernard and Singapore Piling and Civil Engineering Company Limited. The S$51.3 million (US$71.1 million in 2022) contract, awarded in October 1983, included three kilometres (1.9 miles) of tunnelling works between the Somerset and City Hall stations.

Due to the soft marine clay at the station site, jet grouting was used to stabilise the soil. In January 1985, the soft soil led to a tunnel cave-in, which formed a six-metre (20 ft) wide hole near Cathay Cinema. The hole was refilled and the soil was further strengthened by injecting a concrete mixture. On 17 June, an engineer died when a crane fell into the work shaft and crushed him. Investigations revealed that the three pieces of timber intended to support the crane were not properly fastened and inadequate in providing support. The contractor was fined S$1,000 (US$1,340 in 2022) for failing to ensure that the crane was capable of handling the load. Despite the incidents, structural work for the station was completed that September.

To help people familiarise themselves with the system, the Mass Rapid Transit Corporation (MRTC) organised an open house at the station on 6 December 1987. Train services commenced on 12 December when the line extension to Outram Park station was officially completed. The station was part of a line service that ran continuously from Yishun station in the north to Lakeside station in the west. From 28 October 1989, it began to serve the NSL with the operational split of the MRT system. (Note: The MRT system was split into East–West Line (running from Tanah Merah station to Lakeside) and the NSL (running from Yishun station to Marina Bay).) In September 2000, the Land Transport Authority (LTA) installed lifts to allow barrier-free access to the station.

=== North East Line (NEL) station ===
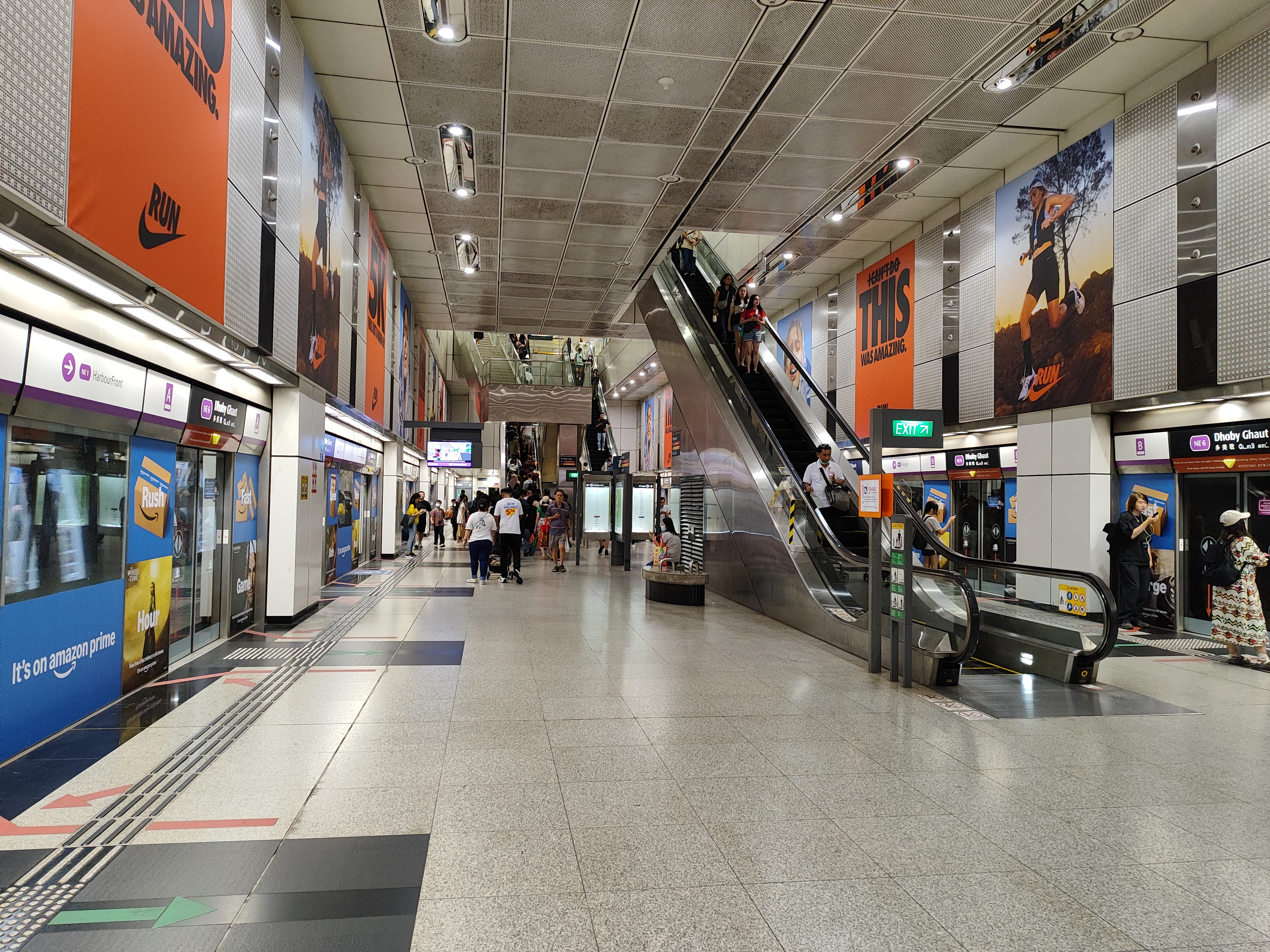
NEL platforms

Plans were made in 1986 for a new line from Outram Park station via Dhoby Ghaut to Punggol station in the northeast. These were finalised as the North East Line (NEL) in January 1996. In August 1997, the LTA awarded Contract C707 for building the NEL station to Obayashi Corporation. The S$268 million (US$288.8 million in 2022) contract included the construction of two commercial buildings above the station. Construction began in 1996, with NEL commencing services on 20 June 2003.

Construction difficulties included having to reroute the Stamford Canal, which bisected the station site, to a temporary canal. The old canal box was rebuilt and replaced by a new, larger box, which lies above the second level of the station. The new canal was temporarily supported by steel piles while the NEL station box was being constructed. With the proximity of works near the existing NSL station and tunnels, (Note: The new station site was situated three meters (9.8 ft) from the existing NSL station while the NEL tunnels were constructed five meters (16 ft) below the NSL tunnels.) motion detectors had to be set up to detect any settlement of the NSL tunnels. To facilitate the station's construction, a part of Mount Sophia, the hill above the site, had to be removed. An eight-meter (26 ft) high sheet pile wall, restrained with ground anchors, supported the unaffected parts of the hill.

Another construction difficulty was the irregular shapes and varying sizes of the station's five levels bound by space constraints. This made it difficult to install the site's temporary retaining walls because of the many voids in between the station levels. (Note: The station construction also required liaison with owners of the buildings and businesses in the area, ensuring the stability and smooth operations of the surrounding businesses above ground.)

=== Circle Line (CCL) station ===
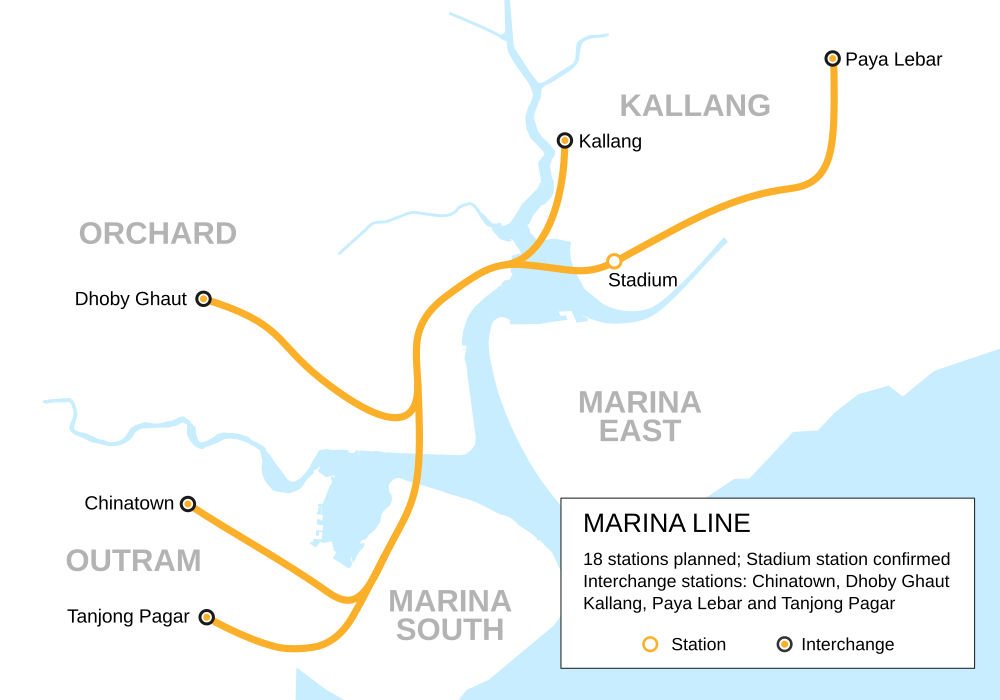
Map of the planned Marina Line

The station box for the Circle Line (CCL) had been put in place when the NEL station was being constructed. It was planned for Dhoby Ghaut station to be the terminus of a branch of the Marina line (MRL). The MRL was finalised to serve six stations from this station to Stadium station in November 1999. The station became part of CCL Stage 1 (CCL1) when the MRL plans were incorporated into the CCL plans in 2001.

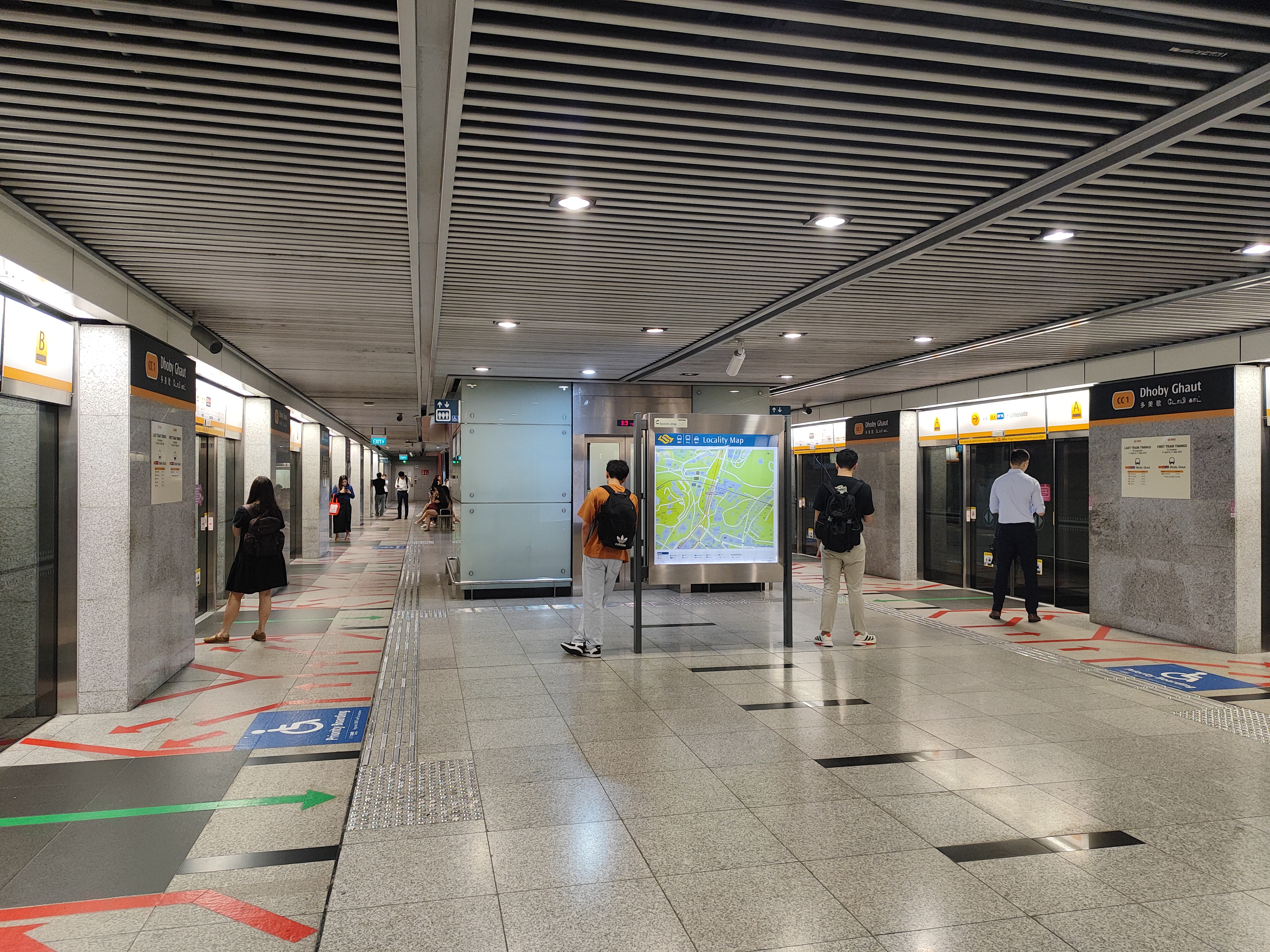
CCL platforms

On 7 August 2001, the LTA awarded Contract 825 for the design and construction of the CCL station and associated tunnels to a joint venture among Shanghai Tunnel Engineering Co. (Singapore) Pte Ltd, Woh Hup Pte Ltd and NCC International AB. The S$343.94 million (US$363.6 million in 2022) contract included building the Bras Basah, Esplanade and Promenade stations. During construction, part of Orchard Road had to be realigned for three months from 10 June 2002. The underpass, linking the NEL and NSL platforms, had to be stabilised while construction works took place underneath. Seven caisson piles were installed to enhance the support of the underpass and capping beams were then constructed to form the supporting system. Along with the other stations on CCL1 and 2, (Note: The CCL1 and 2 consist of 11 stations from this station to Tai Seng.) the station began operations on 17 April 2010.

As part of a joint emergency preparedness exercise by the LTA and train operators SBS Transit and SMRT trains, security screenings were held at this station on 6 August 2024. Metal detectors and X-ray machines were deployed for the screening of commuters and their belongings during the exercise.

== Station details ==
=== Location and name ===
The station is located in the eponymous Dhoby Ghaut along the eastern end of Orchard Road, near the junction of Handy Road and Bras Basah Road. It is on a former Jewish cemetery that was in operation between 1841 and 1983. The station name, Dhoby Ghaut, is a Hindi term referring to the area's past as a traditional Indian open-air laundry (dhoby means "washerman" while ghat means "place or steps along a river").

Landmarks surrounding the station include The Istana, the MacDonald House, the Young Men's Christian Association building, the House of Tan Yeok Nee, Singapore Management University and the National Museum of Singapore. It is underneath retail and commercial developments such as Plaza Singapura shopping mall and The Atrium@Orchard office complex.

=== Services ===
The station is served by the NSL, NEL and CCL and is the first triple-line interchange on the MRT network. The official station codes are NS24/NE6/CC1. When it opened, it had the station code of N1 before being changed to the current alphanumeric style in August 2001 as a part of a system-wide campaign to cater to the expanding MRT System. Dhoby Ghaut station generally operates between 5:30 am and 12:15 am. The first train on the CCL departs from the station at 5:37 am and the last train departs for Kranji station on the NSL at 12:13 am. On the NSL, Dhoby Ghaut station is between the Somerset and City Hall stations, with a headway of 2 to 5 mins in both directions. The station is between the Clarke Quay and Little India stations on the NEL, with a headway of 2.5 to 5 mins in both directions. The station is the terminus of CCL inner spur to the station; the adjacent station is Bras Basah station. Train services run every 4 to 6 minutes throughout the day. CCL trains to and from Dhoby Ghaut outside of peak hours terminate at Stadium, while during peak hours they continue anticlockwise until and reverses at Prince Edward Road.

=== Station design ===
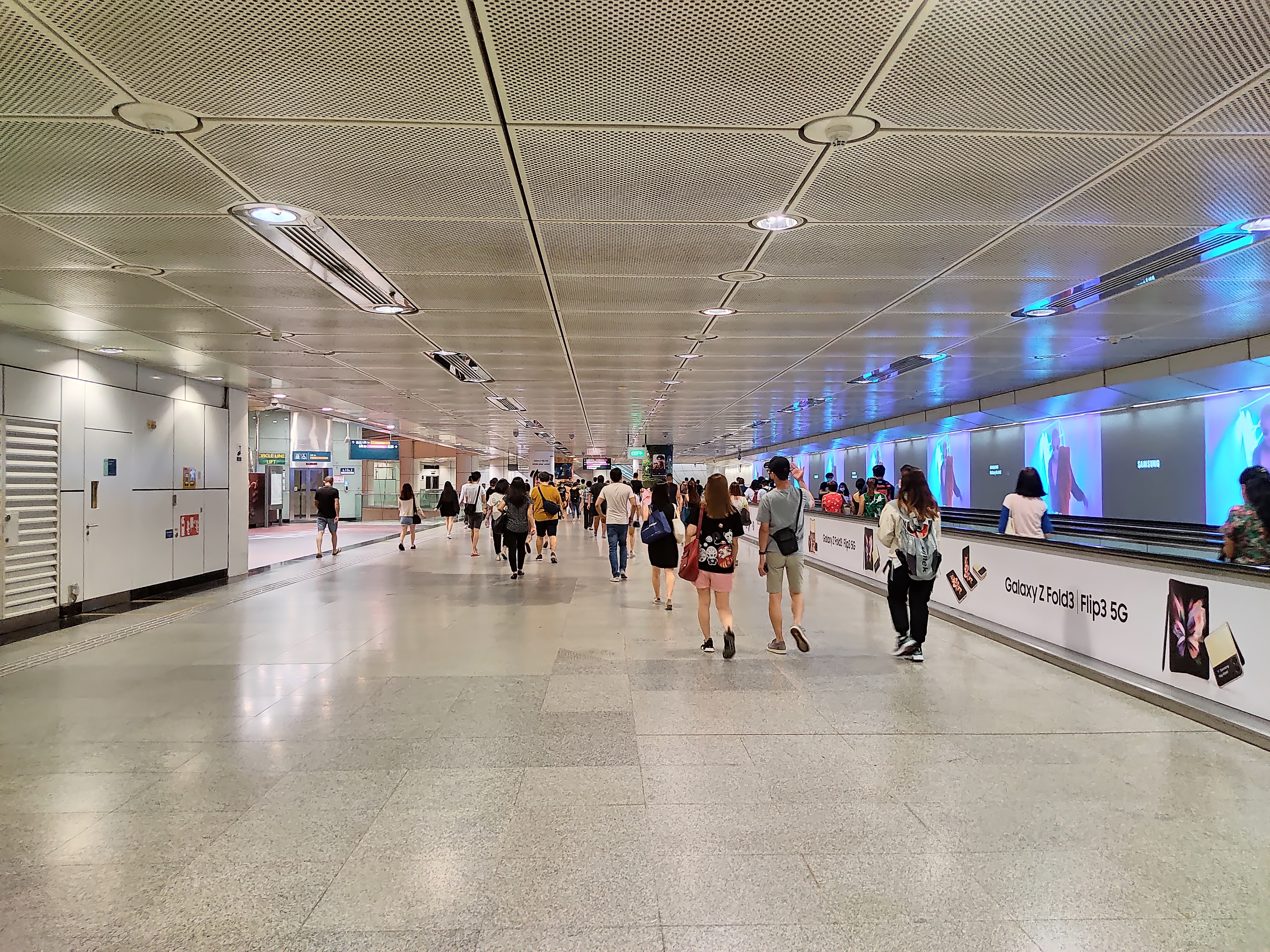
The linkway between the NEL and NSL platforms with the travelator

Serving three MRT lines, the five-level underground station is the largest station on the network, with seven entrances connecting to the various developments around the station. The 180-metre (590 ft) long NSL station, designed by French architect Spielman and local partner Chok and Associates, is located at Basement 3 of the station. The NSL station has brown and black geometric patterns that run throughout the station. These patterns guide passengers to the platforms, which has diamond-shaped tiles to indicate the platform screen doors. Initially with three levels, the station expanded to five underground levels with the NEL platforms.

The NEL platforms, constructed 28 metres (92 ft) below ground at Basement 5, were the deepest on the network until 2010 when Bras Basah station on the CCL opened. Dhoby Ghaut station is the first MRT station to feature a set of 55-metre (180 ft) travelators that link the NEL and NSL platforms. The expanded station is integrated with the twin-towered office complex The Atrium@Orchard above the station. The first such integration on the MRT network allows for more efficient land use while improving access to public transport. The station also has retail shops collectively part of Staytion Lifestyle Centre, previously SMRT's Dhoby Ghaut XChange. It was initially planned for these shops to be taken over by an anchor tenant due to low footfall from the COVID-19 pandemic, but SMRT's retail arm Stellar Lifestyle instead revamped the retail space as part of a new themed retail concept.

Unlike the other NEL stations, the station itself is not designated as a Civil Defence shelter; an underground car park underneath the ten-storey tower is a designated shelter instead. As a result, the station is more spacious and naturally illuminated with lightwells. The station architecture received an "honourable mention" at the Singapore Institute of Architects Design Awards in 2003.

The station is wheelchair accessible. The NSL station, initially without accessible facilities, has been upgraded to include lifts, ramps and dedicated toilets for the disabled. A tactile system, consisting of tiles with rounded or elongated raised studs, guides visually impaired commuters through the station, with dedicated routes that connect the station entrances to the platforms or between the lines. There are wider fare gates that allow easier access for wheelchair users into the station.

== Public art ==
The station features six pieces of artworks. The artworks on the NEL and CCL platforms were commissioned as part of the MRT network Art-in-Transit programme, a showcase that integrates public artwork in the MRT network.

=== Lantern of Music ===
The mobile sculpture Lantern of Music by Tan Ping Chiang is suspended from the ceiling in the NSL concourse. Intended to depict Singapore's multiracial culture, the sculpture resembles three lanterns. The largest "lantern" portrays the traditional and contemporary musical instruments of Singapore's different ethnic groups, while the two smaller lanterns portray the dances of these ethnic groups and opera masks. It was installed as part of the MRTC's S$2 million (US$3 million in 2022) commission of artworks at six MRT stations along the NSL.

=== Interchange ===
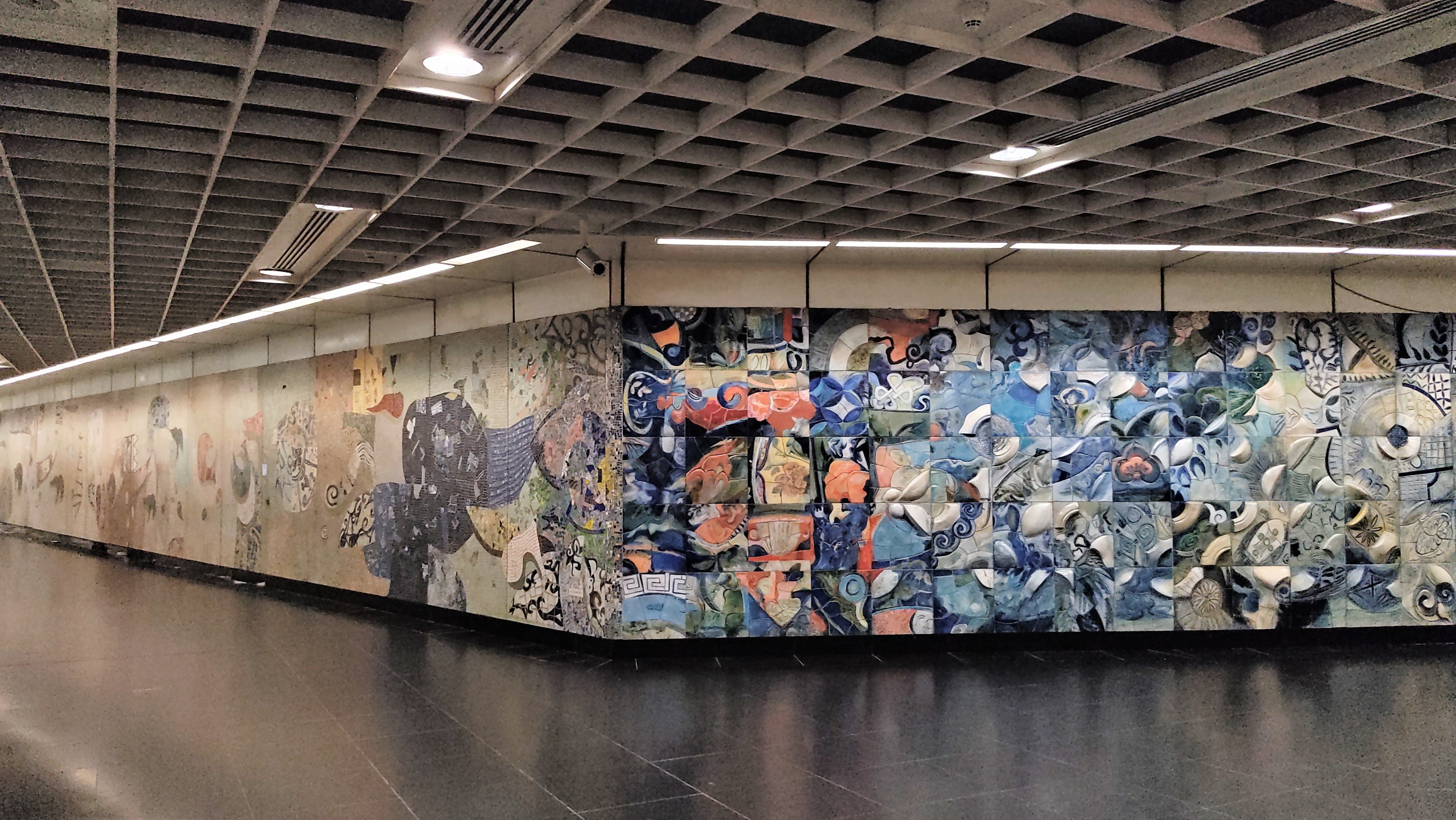
Milenko's mosaics on the walls of the linkway between the North–South and North East lines as part of his and his wife Delia's artwork Interchange

Milenko and Delia Prvacki's artwork Interchange is displayed across the linkway between the NSL and NEL portions of the interchange. Featured on the walls, columns and the floor, including the floor mosaic at the foot of the escalators and ceramic works on four pillars, the artwork is a combination of Delia's ceramic works with Milenko's earthy mosaics. Seeking to reflect the ethnic‑cultural diversity of Singapore and the region, the Prvackis integrated various local and regional cultural elements such as batik, Peranakan clothing and Chinese ceramics.

The station's role as an interchange between the lines, its layout and the cultural history of Singapore inspired the artwork, which was the first major collaborative work between the couple. The artists fused these elements to create modern art "expressed in a marriage of languages" while remaining sensitive to tradition and environment. Delia's ceramics were inspired by Chinese ceramics which she was fascinated by since her first introduction to them by a teacher 30 years ago. In this work, she took the opportunity to renew her passion. Milenko's mosaics are closely related to his life experiences and sense of identity. He explained that, in his home country of Serbia, mosaic is an important art form in Byzantine culture.

Unlike many other NEL artworks, the artists hand-crafted the work, with Milenko and his four assistants working on his thousands of miniature mosaic tiles. To emphasise the fusion of the artwork, the artists subtly adapted elements of each other's portions in their works. Delia's porcelains were integrated into Milenko's mosaics while his mosaic patterns were among the various spiral and elliptical shapes of Delia's tiles. Some patterns and colours are repeated so that the different parts of the work share a common theme. Reflecting on the artwork, the Prvackis said that the project was a learning experience for them that required stretching their artistic thinking within the structural requirements while meeting the needs of commuters. Milenko added it was a "rare pleasure" working with his wife on the project.

=== Universal Language ===
Another artwork, Universal Language by Sun Yu-Li, consists of 180‑floor tiles with various motifs distributed across the station. These tiles, accompanied by 14 glass plates positioned at various places in the station, act as wayfinding icons and guide commuters through the complex interchange via six different routes. These symbols lead to a large floor mosaic and a glass mural displayed at the centre of the station at Basement 2. The mosaic and mural incorporate the motifs used on the tiles.

The artwork, which reflects Sun's background as an architect, was created to address the station's complex layout. Sun also wanted his work to be enjoyable to commuters. Derived from the station's role as a "gateway" for arts and culture in the area, he hoped to explore an "objective" and "pure form of expression" that connected to all cultures. This led Sun to develop a "universal language of symbols" based on prehistoric art. The hunter, dancer, rider, animal, fish and bird were used as different sets of symbols for each of the six routes. The initial concept was for the figures to emerge over time after accumulating dust and dirt. However, to improve the visibility of certain complex shapes, the figures were chemically treated.

=== Man and Environment ===
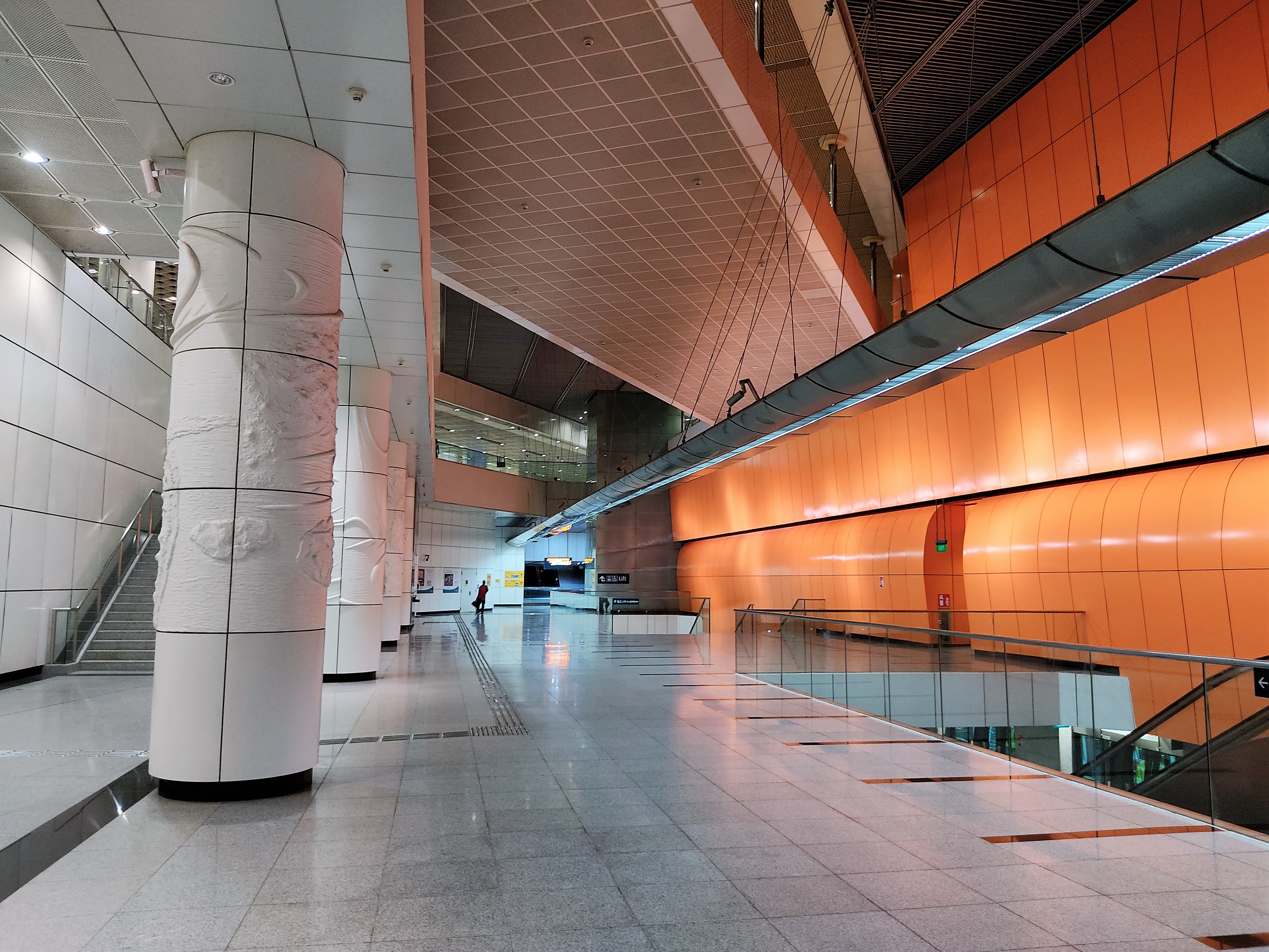
Man and Environment by Baet Yeok Kuan sculpted on the pillars at the CCL concourse of the station.

The CCL station features a wall relief, Man and Environment by Baet Yeok Kuan. The work consists of 36 white gypsum sculptures across the three columns supporting the CCL station. These sculptures depict unusual textures the artist captured in the station's vicinity alongside impressions of rocks and plants. The artwork intends to urge commuters to be more perceptive of less evident details while relieving the pressures of commuting through the fast-paced station environment.

In creating the artwork, Baet used pencil and paper to sketch rubbings, while using plasticine to capture moulds. These collections of impressions were used as inspiration for the series of organic forms that the artwork uses. The work intends to connect commuters to their immediate surroundings while considering the station's functionality and design. The sculptures are kept in their original white—the colour of the gypsum used to construct the station and artwork—to blend with the orange walls of the station, which signify the CCL's colour. The colour also avoids distracting commuters while making them comfortable.

The work was produced over three months. Each of the 1 by 0.9 m (3.3 by 3.0 ft) art pieces was hand-sculpted in clay to create the mould for the actual gypsum sculpture. Baet was closely involved in the process and ensured the work had an organic and smooth texture. The sculptures were installed carefully near the operational area of the station to prevent disruption to commuters. The final touches to the work were moulded by hand, rather than using noisier and dustier power tools. Reflecting on his work, Baet felt he had "served the public" and found the project to be "very meaningful"; he hoped for his work to be relevant to commuters' daily travels.

=== Matrix ===
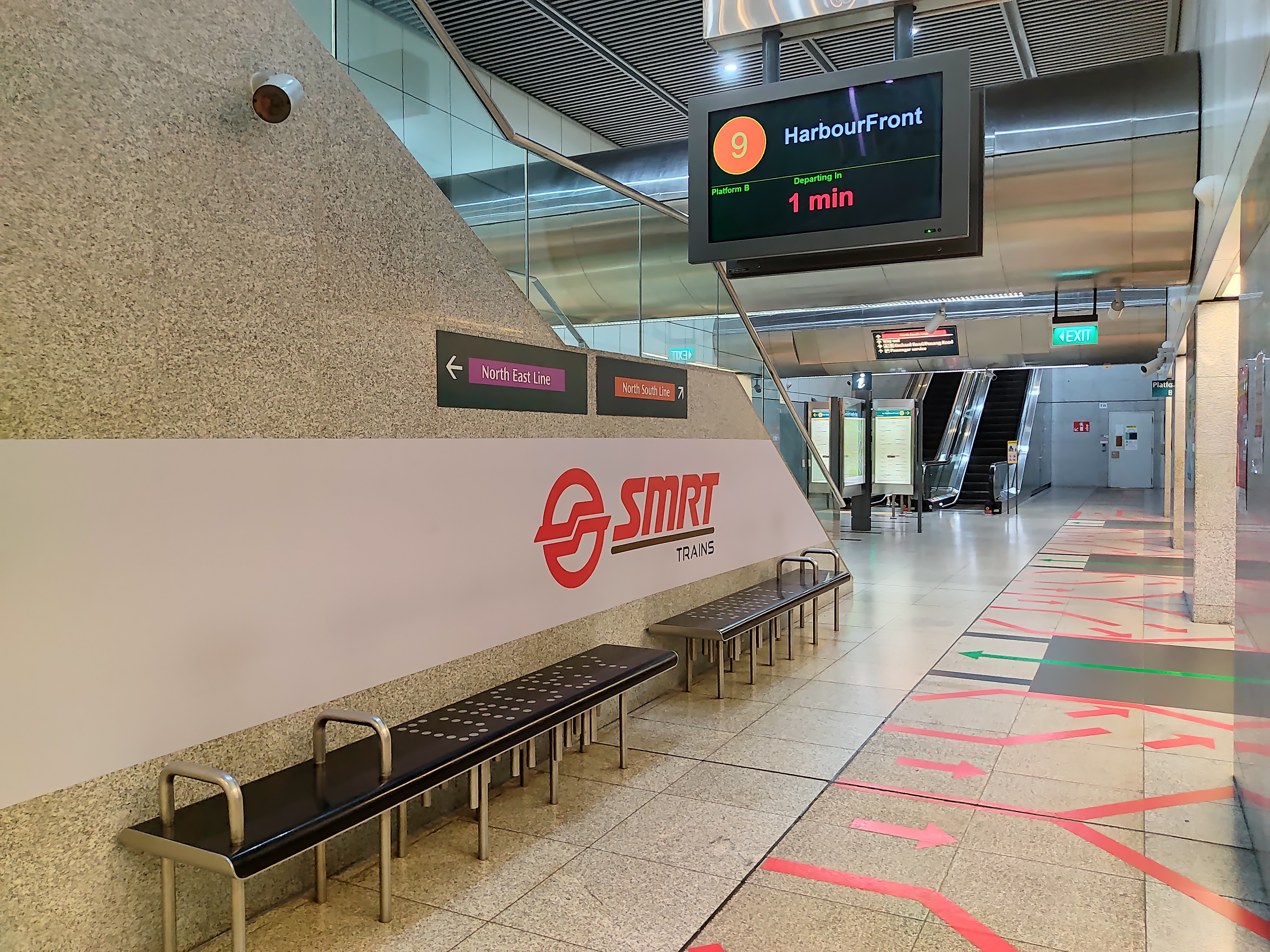
Matrix benches at the CCL platform

The CCL platforms feature a set of "art seats" entitled Matrix. Though the platform seats are intended to be works of art, they are designed to remain functional and practical. This work by Lui Honfay and Yasmine Chan, along with Rain, was selected through the International Art Seats Design Competition in 2006. Matrix consists of a series of benches engraved with the station name in a dot-matrix style on the seat surface. The dot-matrix system was adopted as it was flexible enough to be mass-produced for use in many stations. The intriguing combination of signage and seat "impressed" the judges who awarded it the top prize.

=== Comic Connect ===
A mural is displayed in the NSL station as part of SMRT's Comic Connect, a public art showcase of heritage-themed murals by the train operator. The mural, created by Lola Liu, Anthony Chong, and Rene Foo of Visual Arts Centre, (Note: An art school in Dhoby Ghaut) depicts the heritage of Dhoby Ghaut through the portrayal of Indian dhobies (washerman), which is the namesake of the area. The work also showcases landmarks such as the MacDonald House, The Istana, National Archives of Singapore, Plaza Singapura, National Museum of Singapore, and The Cathay.

== Notes and references ==
=== Bibliography ===
- Cheong, Colin (2012). The Circle Line: Linking All Lines. Singapore: Land Transport Authority. ISBN 978-981-4342-02-5.
- Leong, Chan Teik (2003). Getting there : The story of the North East Line. Singapore: Land Transport Authority. ISBN 981-04-5886-X. OCLC 53383062.
- Tan, Su (2003). Art in transit : North East Line MRT. Singapore: Land Transport Authority. ISBN 981-04-7384-2. OCLC 52771106.
- Zhuang, Justin (2013). Art in transit : Circle Line MRT. Singapore: Land Transport Authority. ISBN 978-981-07-4982-8. OCLC 854958677.
