= Joseph Aaron Elias =

Singaporean businessman

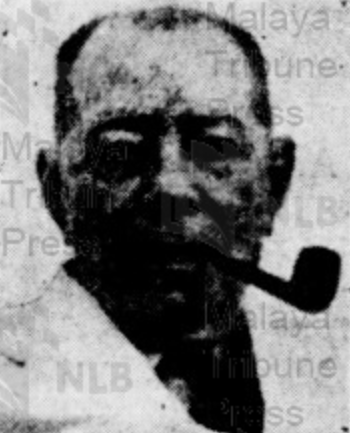
Joseph Aaron Elias

Joseph Aaron Elias (1881 — 16 July 1949) was a businessman and a member of the Municipal Commission of Singapore.

== Early life ==
Elias was born in Calcutta in 1881. He was the eldest son of Aaron and Sarina Elias. His father was involved in the opium trade, and had become very wealthy from it.

== Career ==
Elias founded the Tampenis Cement Tile Works, which manufactured flooring tiles and imitation marble. However, he later sold the company off. He was the director and an investor to several companies, including Pajan Rubber Plantation, Indragiri Rubber Estate, Kuchai Tin Mines and Linguis Tin Mines. He also established the Singapore Building Corporation, as well as Fresh Food and Refrigerator Co. Ltd., a refrigeration business which was sold to Cold Storage in 1931. He was a director of The Malaya Tribune and owned the Pavilion Cinema on Orchard Road.

In 1918, Elias was made a Justice of the Peace. In 1920, he became a member of the Municipal Commission of Singapore. In 1927, he was made a trustee of the Singapore Improvement Trust. In 1929, he was made a trustee of the Maghain Aboth Synagogue. He was also a member of the Housing Commission.

== Personal life ==
Elias was a horse-racing enthusiast, and owned a stable on Grange Road. He was among the first to import racehorses into Singapore. He was also a motor enthusiast.

Elias died on 16 July 1949. Elias Road, Elias Green and Elias Terrace were named after him.
