= Dhoby Ghaut Green =

Park in Singapore

Coordinates: 1°17′55″N 103°50′42″E

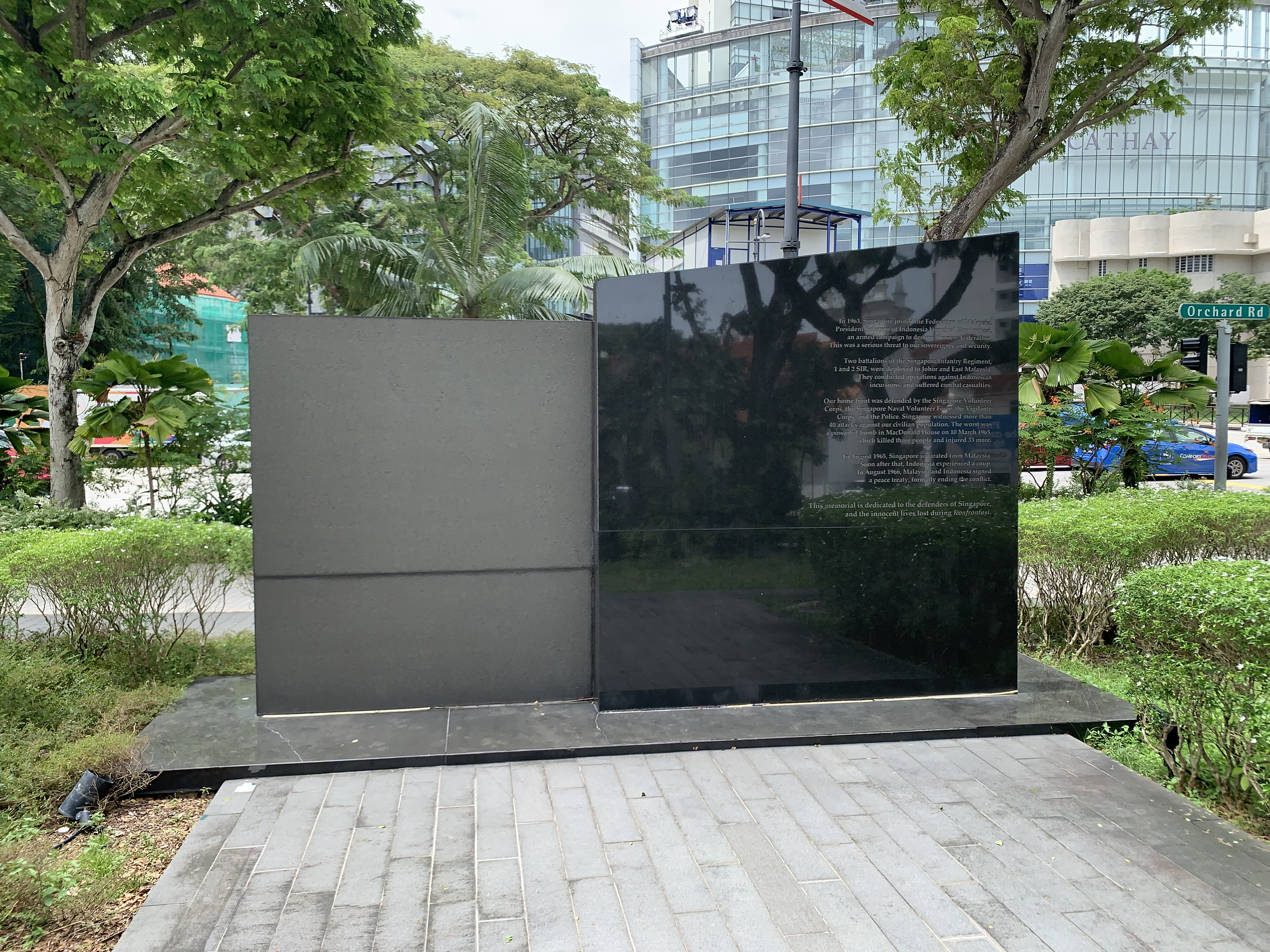
- Memorial to the Victims of Konfrontasi
- Interactive map of Dhoby Ghaut Green
- Type: City and heritage park
- Location: Dhoby Ghaut, Singapore
- Area: 1.1144 hectares (11,144 m^{2})
- Created: 24 October 2009; 16 years ago
- Manager: National Parks Board
- Status: Opened
- Public transit: NS24 NE6 CC1 Dhoby Ghaut
- Website: Dhoby Ghaut Green

Dhoby Ghaut Green is an urban park in Singapore located adjacent to Dhoby Ghaut MRT station, opposite the Park Mall.

== History ==
On 18 September 2021, Prime Minister Lee Hsien Loong announced that a garden at Dhoby Ghaut Green could be chosen as a public space dedicated to the women of Singapore as part of a proposal by the Singapore Council of Women's Organisations that was accepted by the Government.

== Design ==
The park was designed by Soo K. Chan of SCDA Architects. Chan was commissioned by the Urban Redevelopment Authority to conceptualize and design the space after he won the Designer of the Year title in Architecture and Urban Design in 2006 at the inaugural President's Design Award, the nation's highest honor for excellence in design. Structural engineering was by Web Structures.

== See also ==
- List of parks in Singapore
