= Sambu Island =

Island in Indonesia

Coordinates: 1°9′35.56″N 103°53′59.29″E

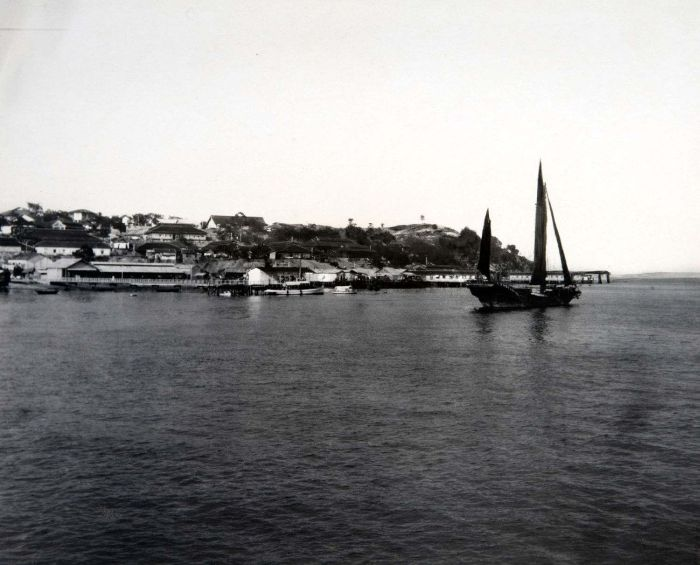
View of Sambu in 1928

Sambu (Indonesian: Pulau Sambu; Chinese: 桑布岛) is a minor island in Riau Islands Province of Indonesia. It is located on the north-western side of Batam island.
