= 111 Somerset =

Office skyscraper in Singapore

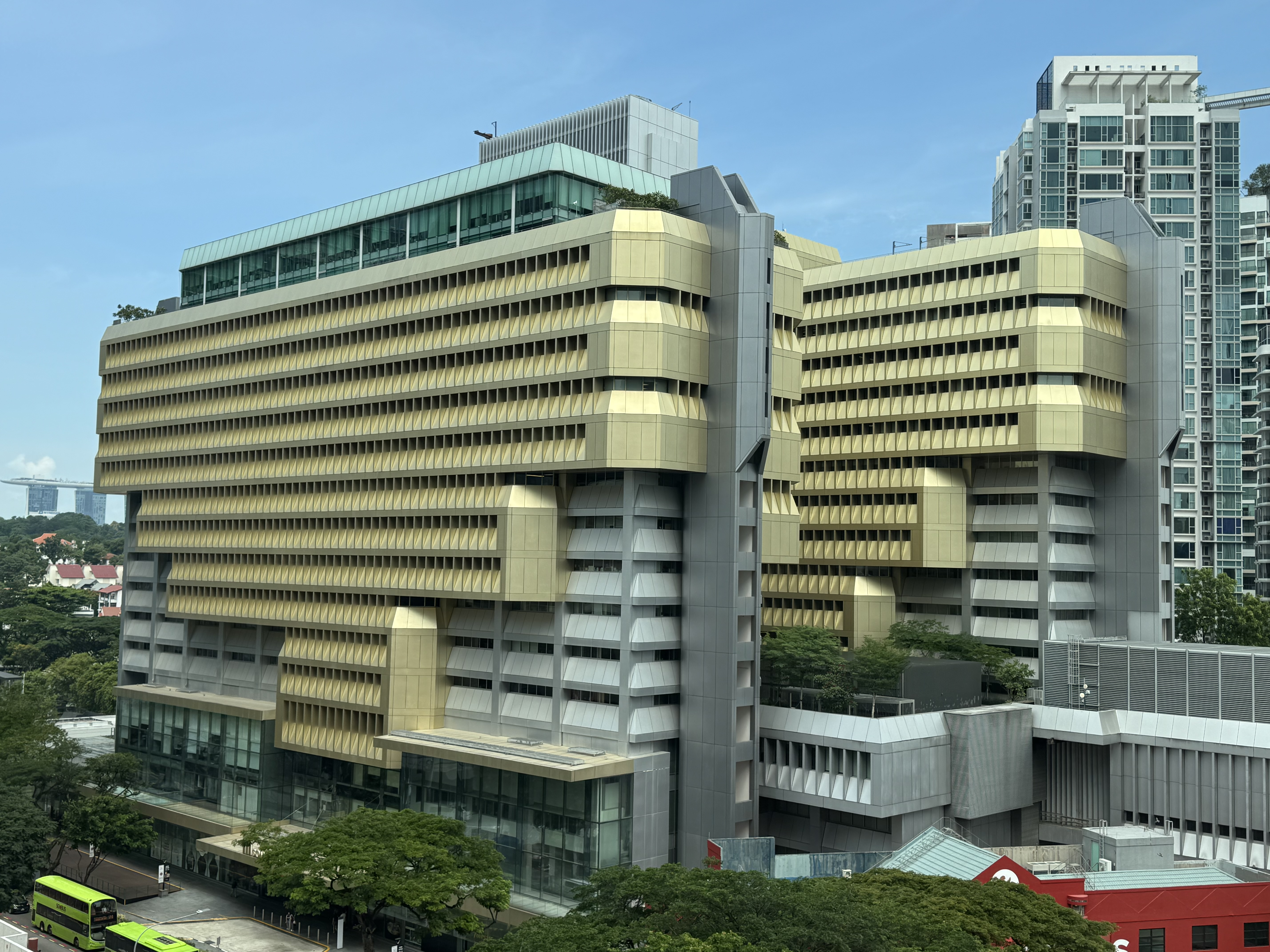
- 111 Somerset in 2026
- Interactive map of the 111 Somerset area

General information
- Status: Completed
- Type: Commercial
- Architectural style: Brutalist architecture
- Location: Orchard, Singapore
- Coordinates: 1°18′01.5″N 103°50′14.0″E
- Opening: 15 March 2015
- Owner: Shun Tak Holdings
- Operator: Shun Tak (Somerset)

Technical details
- Floor count: 17

Website
- https://111somerset.com.sg/

111 Somerset is a high-rise commercial building and shopping mall in Orchard, Singapore. The building was first known as Public Utilities Board Building (PUB Building) until 1995, and was later known as Singapore Power Building until 2008 when acquired by YTL Corporation Pacific Star. It used to house the headquarters of SP Group, until it shifted to its current site at Kallang.

It includes two office towers and a retail podium. It is currently being managed by Shun Tak (Somerset).

== History ==
The PUB Building, located near Singapore's main shopping belt of Orchard Road, was built to accommodate several departments of the Public Utilities Board which had outgrown its office space in City Hall.

The building was the result of an architectural design competition. In July 1971, a contest to design PUB's corporate headquarters was launched. Of 23 submissions, four were picked by a jury headed by then PUB chairman Lim Kim San. The proposal by the now-defunct Singapore architectural firm Group 2 Architects (1970–1978), formed by Ong Chin Bee and Tan Puay Huat, won.

Built to a height of 100 metres (328 ft), the PUB Building was completed in 1977; construction cost S$32 million. It was renamed as the Singapore Power Building, after PUB's electricity and gas operations were corporatised to Singapore Power on 1 October 1995. The Singapore Power Building was renovated in 2006, when Singapore Power chose not to redevelop its corporate headquarters. Instead, it opted to refurbish and reclad the building in silvery metal.

On 29 January 2007, PUB moved out of the building to join its parent ministry, Ministry of the Environment and Water Resources, at the Environment Building on Scotts Road. When YTL Pacific Star acquired the building in February 2008, it was renamed to its present name. The new owner undertook a S$50 million renovation and added more retail space to the building by converting offices, a cafeteria, empty spaces in the lobby areas as well as the carpark and the auditorium. It now has 500,000 square feet (46,000 m^{2}) of offices, 60,000 square feet (5,600 m^{2}) of retail space and a 5,000 square feet (460 m^{2}) outdoor refreshment area. The reopening of the complex in 2010 included a FairPrice Finest supermarket.

== Architecture ==
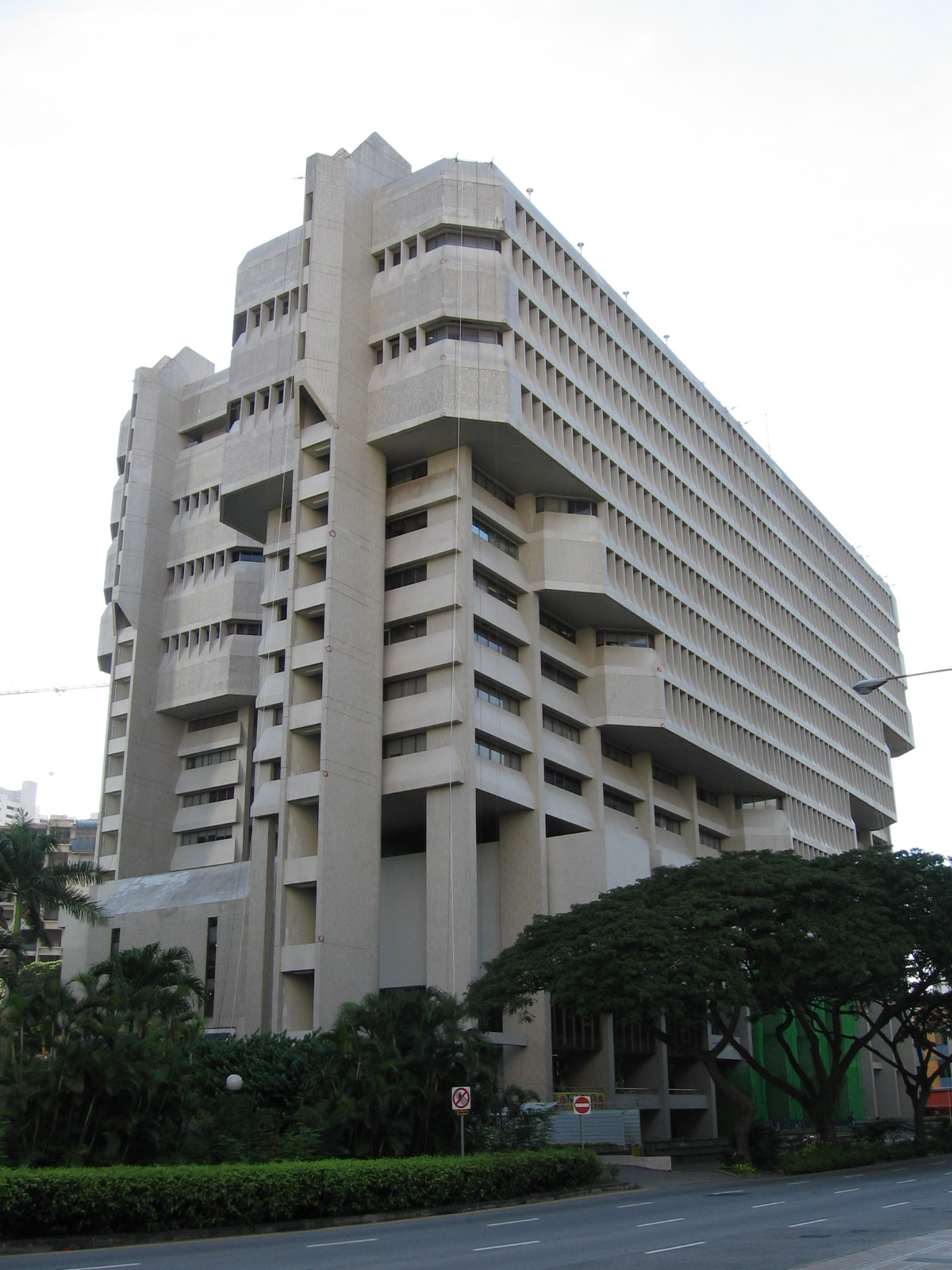
The "Brutalist" style of architecture is observed through the original façade of the Singapore Power Building, clad in square mosaic and rectangular ceramic tiles, before its renovation in 2006.

=== Design concept ===
In the 1971 design competition for the PUB Building, the other three finalists proposed high-rise structures to project a corporate image. However, Group 2 Architect's winning design, in the jury's words, allowed "natural form and function to achieve character and dignity" for the building. The 17-storey high PUB building shows the influence of Gerhard M. Kallmann's 1962 Boston City Hall, also a competition winner, which was, in turn, influenced by Le Corbusier's Sainte Marie de La Tourette (1957–1960) by . The development of the form of the PUB Building was mannerist, however, in contrast to the inherent logic evident in La Tourette, and to some degree in the City Hall.

The design and architecture of the building resulted in a Modernist architectural style known as Brutalism. This style of architecture was popular with government buildings in the 1970s and 80s.

Situated between Somerset Road and Devonshire Road, Group 2 Architects designed the PUB Building as an H-shaped block with a central service core and a naturally-ventilated lobby. Facing north and south, the two parallel wings are of unequal height, and are linked by a wider transverse area three floors in height, and further up by the lift shaft and the access to each floor. Between the two wings is a landscaped courtyard.

=== Horizontal emphasis ===
The architects sought to create an approachable building that reflected the role of the PUB as a public supplier of gas and electricity, and this led them to choose strong horizontal elements for the design. In the building's façade, this is achieved with distinctive rows of vertical fins, staggered so as to emphasise horizontal movement; these fins also provide shade. A secondary horizontal pattern results from grouping two or more rows of these fins in blocks.

The Singapore Power Building's defining architectural motif is its "inverted ziggurat" façade. The building tapers from cantilevered upper floors to recessed lower floors, and the resulting overhangs help to shade the lower levels, a logical response to the tropical climate. The tropical setting also led to the provision of a generous shaded concourse at ground level. It was the combination of design features intended to reflect the climate, together with an objective of making the floor areas congruent with the size of the administrative elements of the utility that occupied them, that resulted in the building's distinctive structural profile. Internally, the building was organised to reflect the distribution of office spaces required by PUB's departments at the time, with more space needed on the upper floors. The chamfered parapets at the ends soften the corners of the building. The length of the building is emphasised and the design elements are visually integrated by vertical projections housing staircases. The staggered façade provides views to the exterior, while offering voids in between that afford "breathing space".

The ground floor of the building was dedicated to public access and use for retail as well. It is entered via wide steps under columns that are three- or four-storeys high, and these pilotis create a sense of space for the naturally ventilated public lobby areas. From the concourse, which is decorated with wall-relief sculptures, steps lead to upper and lower public service areas, a cafeteria and carparks.

The original design of the Singapore Power Building was executed virtually without later alteration although it would later be surrounded by hotels, the Somerset MRT station and shopping complexes.

=== Structural framework ===
The structural framework of the building utilises a simple system of reinforced concrete beams and slabs, and was originally clad in square mosaic and rectangular ceramic tiles on its walls and columns. The building's foundation comprises large diameter bored piles installed in decomposed sandstone. Beams span an average 7.6 metres except at the main entrance where post-tensioned concrete beams span 15 metres. The auditorium is roofed over by 24-metre long steel trusses with a composite reinforced concrete covering.

== See also ==
- List of Brutalist structures
