= Vue Privée =

Art gallery in Singapore

Coordinates: 1.28450°N 103.80958°E

Vue Privée [vp], is an art gallery space in Singapore. It housed in Orchard Road. The space consists of two floors of exhibition and retail area located in a 3,000 sq ft (280 m^{2}) pre-war Peranakan shophouse.

== Influence on the Singapore Art Scene ==
Time Out Singapore has ranked the gallery as one of the 50 movers and shakers in the Singapore Art scene. Since the gallery's conception it has also been featured in local publications like The Straits Times and Tatler Singapore.

== See also ==
- Fine-art photography
- Contemporary art
