= The Centrepoint =

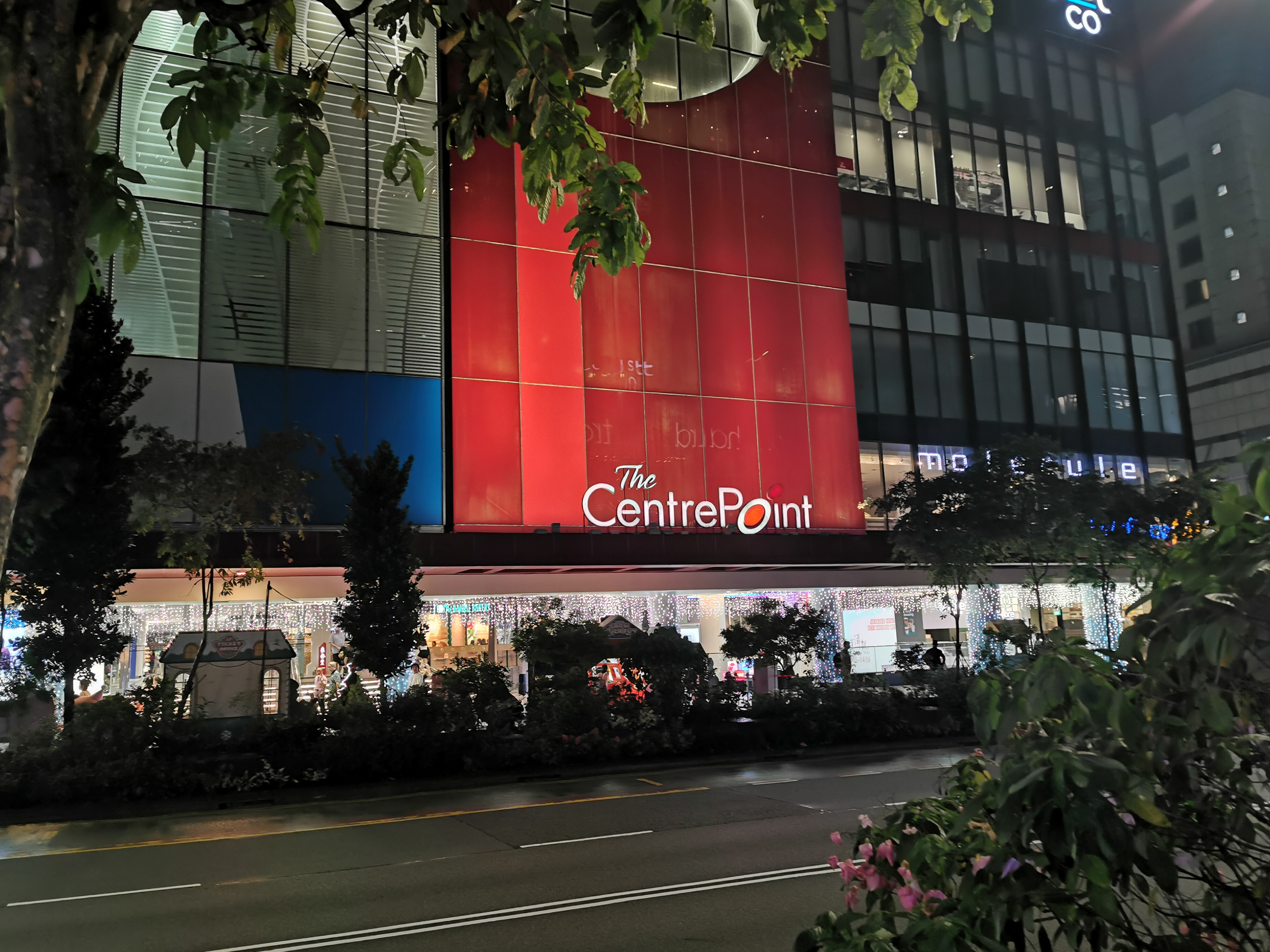
- The Centrepoint at night
- Location: Singapore
- Coordinates: 1°18′5.5″N 103°50′22.5″E
- Address: 176 Orchard Road
- Opened: May 1983
- Developer: Frasers Centrepoint
- Manager: Frasers Centrepoint
- Owner: Frasers Centrepoint
- Num. of stores: 180
- Num. of anchor tenants: 2
- Floor area: 408,899 square feet (37,988.0 m^{2})
- Floors: 8
- Public transit: NS23 Somerset
- Website: The Centrepoint

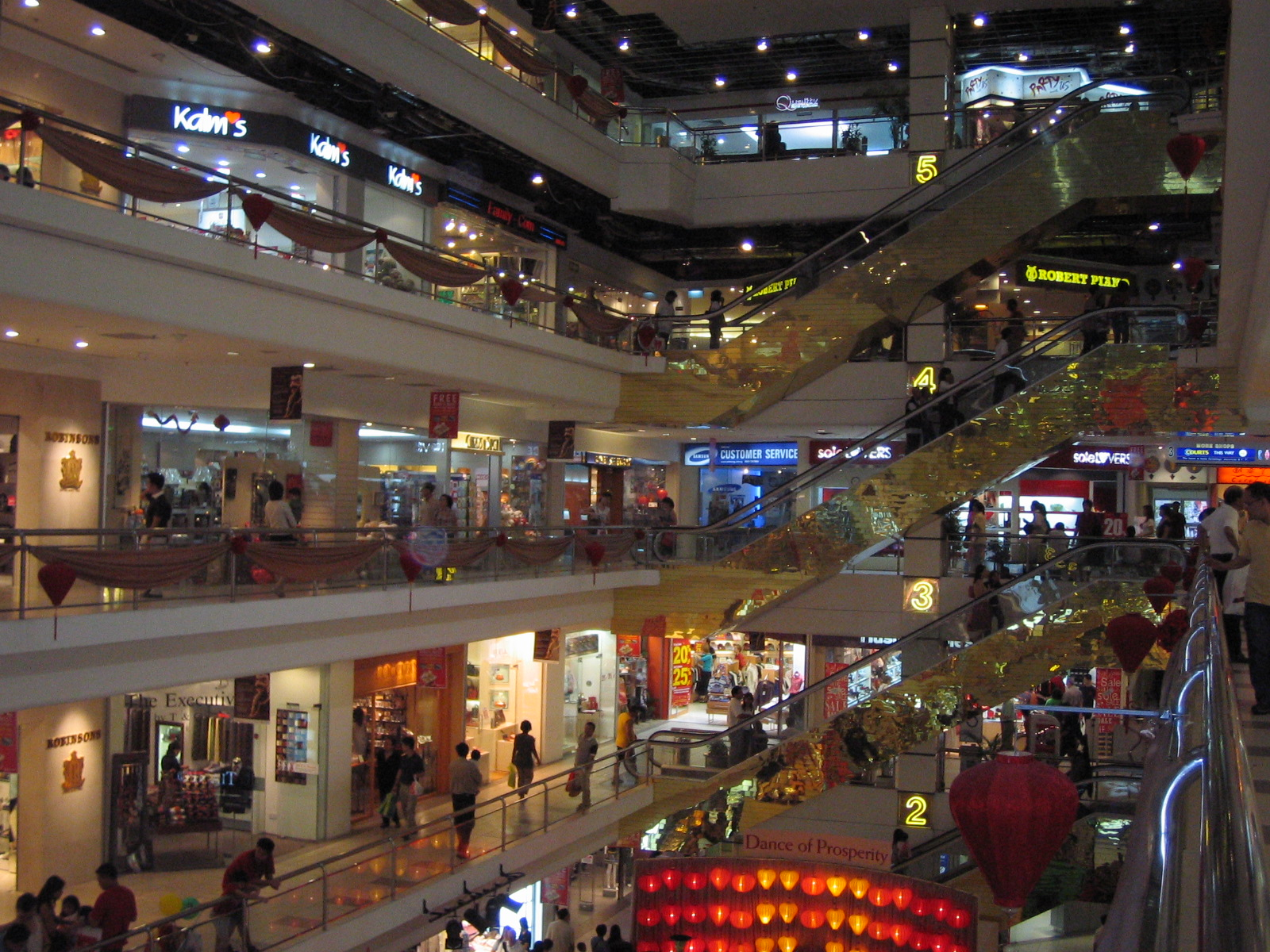
The interior of The Centrepoint.

The Centrepoint is a shopping mall in Singapore which opened in 1983 as Centrepoint Shopping Centre (or just Centrepoint) until its renaming in 2006 as The Centrepoint.

== History ==
The Centrepoint is managed by Frasers Property, which is a wholly owned subsidiary of Fraser & Neave. It was built in 1983. Throughout the decades, the eight-storey complex was home to many different tenants, including Teochew City Seafood Restaurant, Cold Storage, Marks and Spencer, TianPo Jewellery, and Metro. The mall, which has six storeys and two basement levels, opened with Robinsons as the anchor tenant. It had been replaced by Metro in 2015, out of which it will be closing down on 15 September 2019. Centrepoint is undergoing third renovation works and is expected to complete by 2020 with more tenants such as Decathlon, JustCo and Harvey Norman.

The shopping mall underwent a makeover in 1991 and the first cost $4 million. The Centrepoint's management committee at the time carried out a survey to find out what customers wanted, and top on the wish list was better toilets. The toilets were fitted with automatic flushing systems and renovation works were carried out at night.

Times Bookstores is also the biggest bookstores in the Orchard Road, of which it opened in 1983. It underwent a revamp in 2002, expanding across three floors but ended up downsized again.

In 2005, Frasers Centrepoint refurbished the mall for the second time. The revamp included a six-storey extension with two basements which was previously a sidewalk. The second basement to Level 3 would be for food and beverage outlets and shops, and Levels 4 to 6 would be an extension of the former Robinsons. The renovation works were completed in December 2006, and there is now a Gap store on Level 2 and an Esprit store on Level 3.

There was a shopping mall decentralisation strategy over the years.

There are plans to transform Orchard Road into a megamall that is connected by a network of linked walkways. Part of this plan is a link bridge between The Centrepoint and Orchard Point. The Straits Times reported that this second major makeover included the widening of its Orchard Road entrance and a new drop-off and pick-up point on level one to make it easier for families with children and the elderly. Apart from this, many of the tenants had begun to leave – Marks & Spencer was replaced by Ministry of Food (MOF).

== Accessibility ==
The Centrepoint is accessible from Orchard Road where vehicles can enter the car park through a side road. Somerset MRT station is located opposite the shopping mall.

== See also ==
- Centrepoint Kids, social history
- List of shopping malls in Singapore
