= Orchard Gateway =

Shopping mall in Singapore

orchardgateway
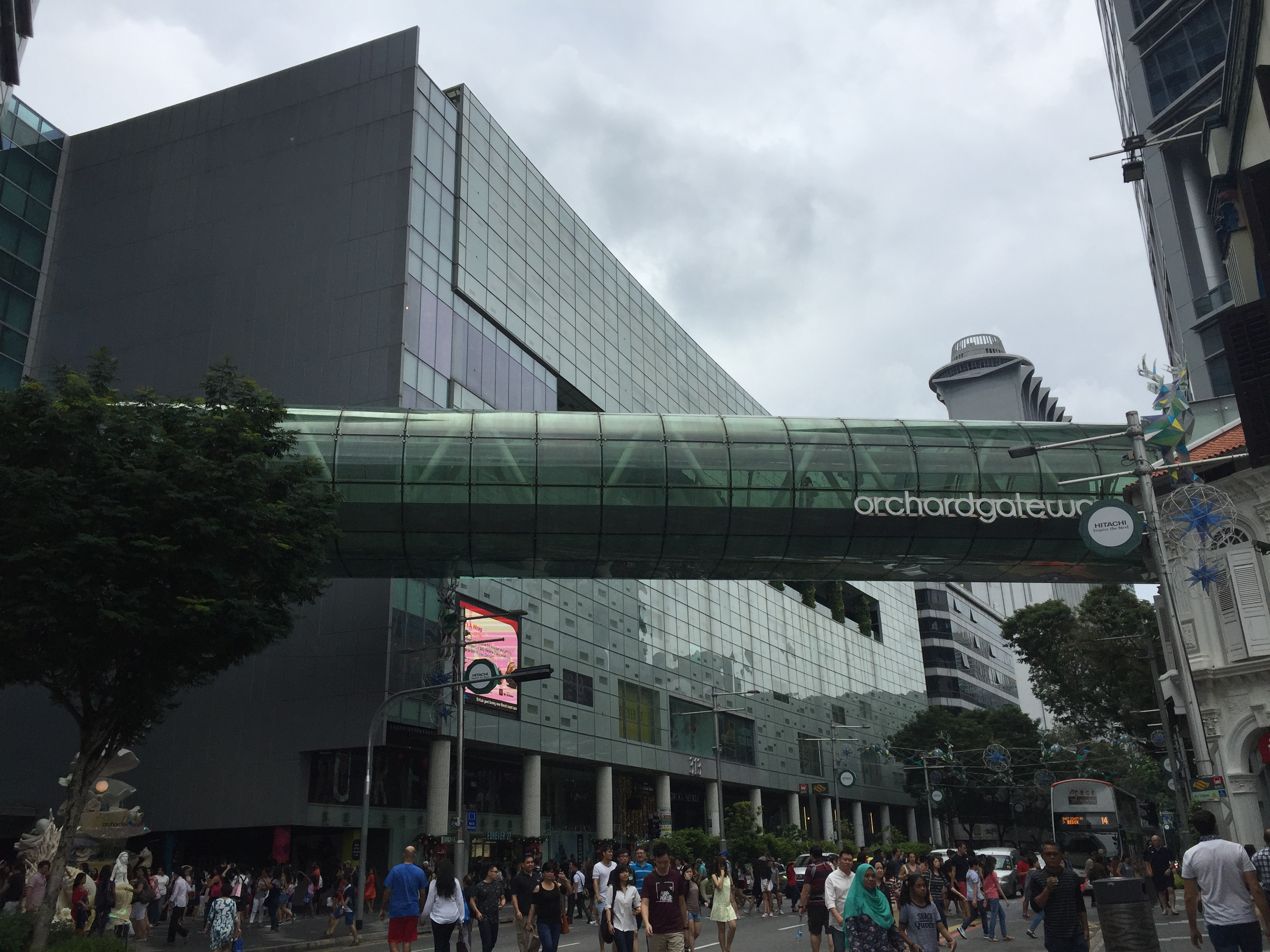
- Location: Orchard, Singapore
- Coordinates: 1.299617°N 103.854408°E
- Address: 277 Orchard Road, Singapore 238858
- Opened: 26 April 2014; 12 years ago
- Developer: Oversea-Chinese Banking Corporation; United Engineers Limited
- Architect: Tange & Associates
- Num. of anchor tenants: 1
- Floor area: 180,000 square feet (17,000 m^{2})
- Floors: 6 (including 2 basement levels)
- Public transit: NS23 Somerset
- Website: www.orchardgateway.sg

Orchard Gateway (stylized as orchardgateway) is a shopping mall in Orchard Road, Singapore, connecting Orchard Central and 313@Somerset together next to Somerset MRT station. The mall was meant to be completed in November 2013, but was delayed and officially opened on 26 April 2014. It was built on the site of the former Specialists Shopping Centre and Orchard Emerald.

The mall is part of an integrated development which includes a hotel and an office tower. The hotel is built above the mall and the office tower is built above orchardgateway@emerald, another shopping mall located opposite Orchard Gateway. The hotel consists of 500 rooms and is linked to the office tower by a glass tubular overhead bridge.

== History ==
Announced on 21 March 2012, the integrated development is jointly developed by Oversea-Chinese Banking Corporation, United Engineers Limited. Developed on land previously occupied by Specialists' Shopping Centre, Phoenix Hotel and Orchard Emerald, the mall with 180,000 square feet of retail space over 6 levels (including the 2 basement levels) houses both local and international lifestyle brands. It is also well connected to the shopping belt of Orchard Road via the glass overhead bridge, an underpass across Orchard Road and inter-mall walkthroughs.

A fire, involving electrical equipment in an equipment room at basement two of the mall, broke out on 9 November 2026 at around 5:40 pm. 100 people were evacuated by the police as a precaution, and nobody injuries were reported.

== Facilities and features ==
The mall has secured international brands such as Crate & Barrel, Religion, Swatch, Nike’s new concept stall called Amplify Women's and a NLB library, library@orchard as tenants. Other tenants include I.T, J.Lindeberg and Red Wing Shoes. American furniture retailer, Crate & Barrel occupies over 3 levels of retail space as the anchor tenant of the shopping mall.

Orchard Gateway is also a sustainable building as it is able to harness bio-gas from compositing food waste to produce electricity, it also has a car-park guidance system that leads motorists to the nearest parking lot to reduce exhaust emissions and also features ultraviolet emitters in air-handling units to improve air quality in the F&B areas of the mall.

=== Hotel Jen orchardgateway ===
Operated by Shangri-La Hotels and Resorts, the first Hotel Jen officially opened on 15 September 2014. Formally known as Traders Hotel, Hotel Jen occupies the hotel building above Orchard Gateway.

== See also ==
- List of shopping malls in Singapore
