= Orchard Central =

Shopping mall in Singapore

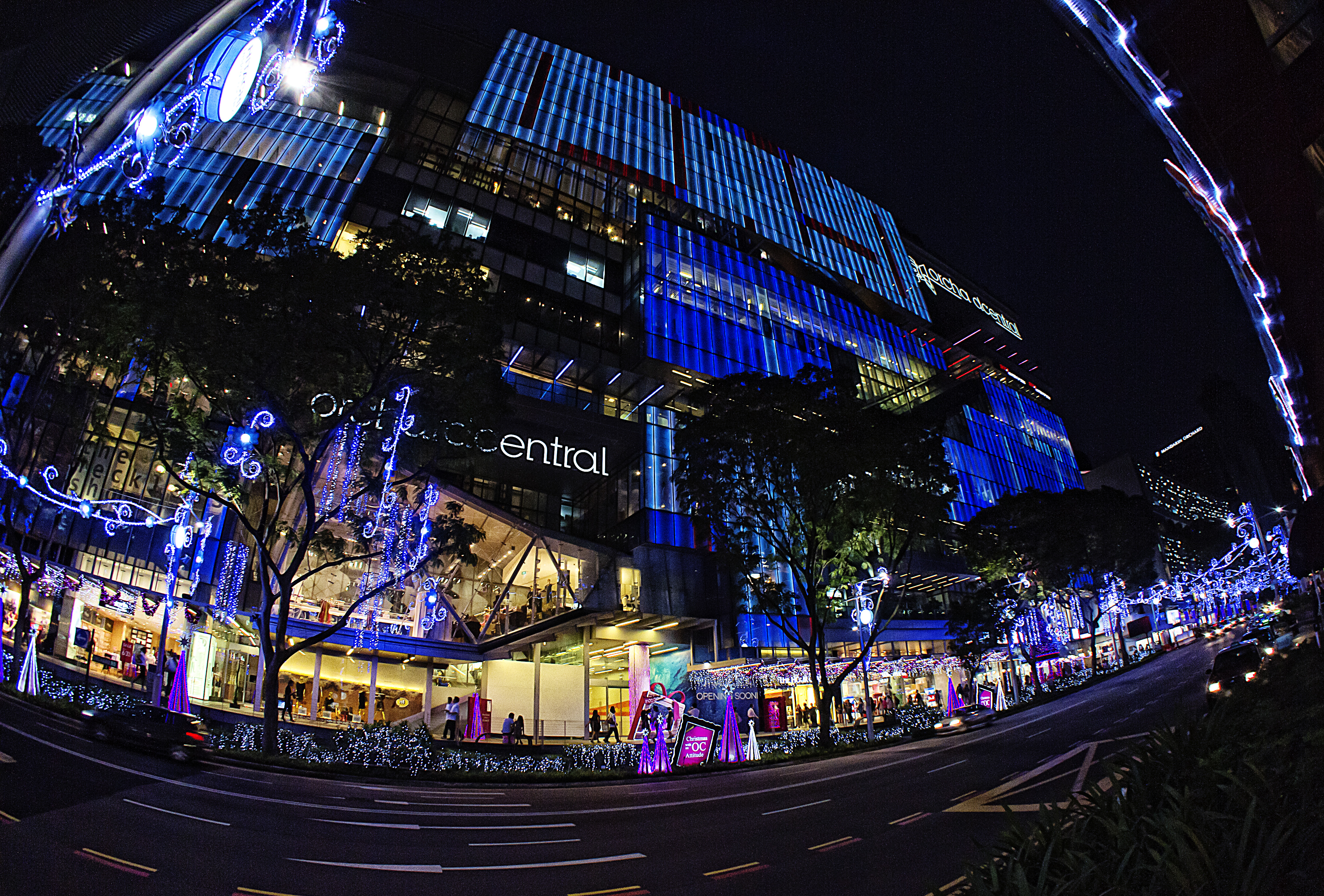
- Facade of Orchard Central
- Location: Singapore
- Address: 181 Orchard Road
- Opened: 2 July 2009; 17 years ago
- Developer: Far East Organization; OCBC Bank
- Manager: Orchard Central Private Limited
- Owner: Far East Organization
- Architect: DP Architects
- Num. of stores: ~400
- Num. of anchor tenants: 3 (Uniqlo, Don Don Donki, Tokyu Hands)
- Floor area: 387,988 square feet (36,045.3 m^{2})
- Floors: 14
- Public transit: NS23 Somerset; NS24 NE6 CC1 Dhoby Ghaut
- Website: orchardcentral.com.sg

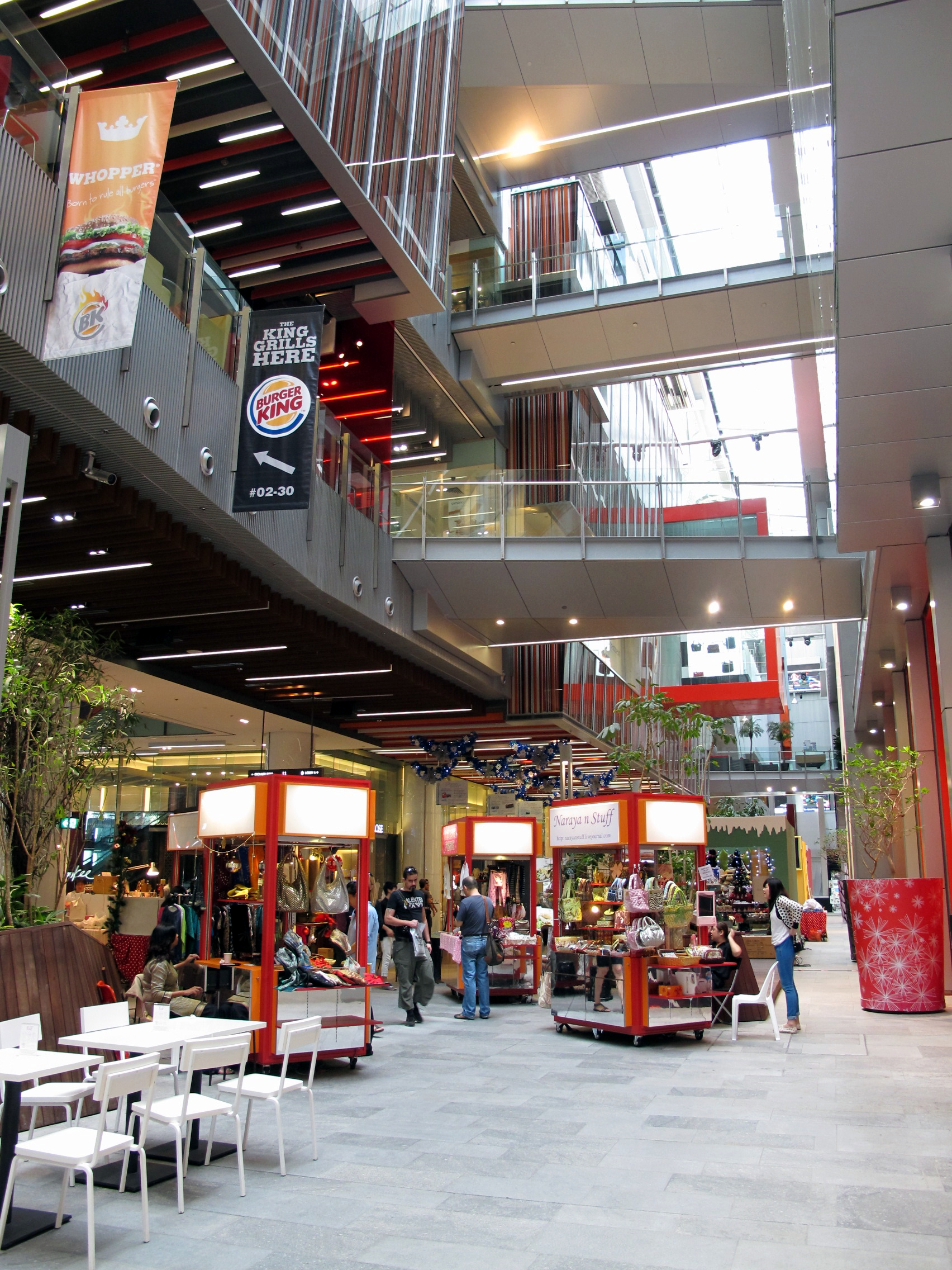
Atrium of the mall (2010)

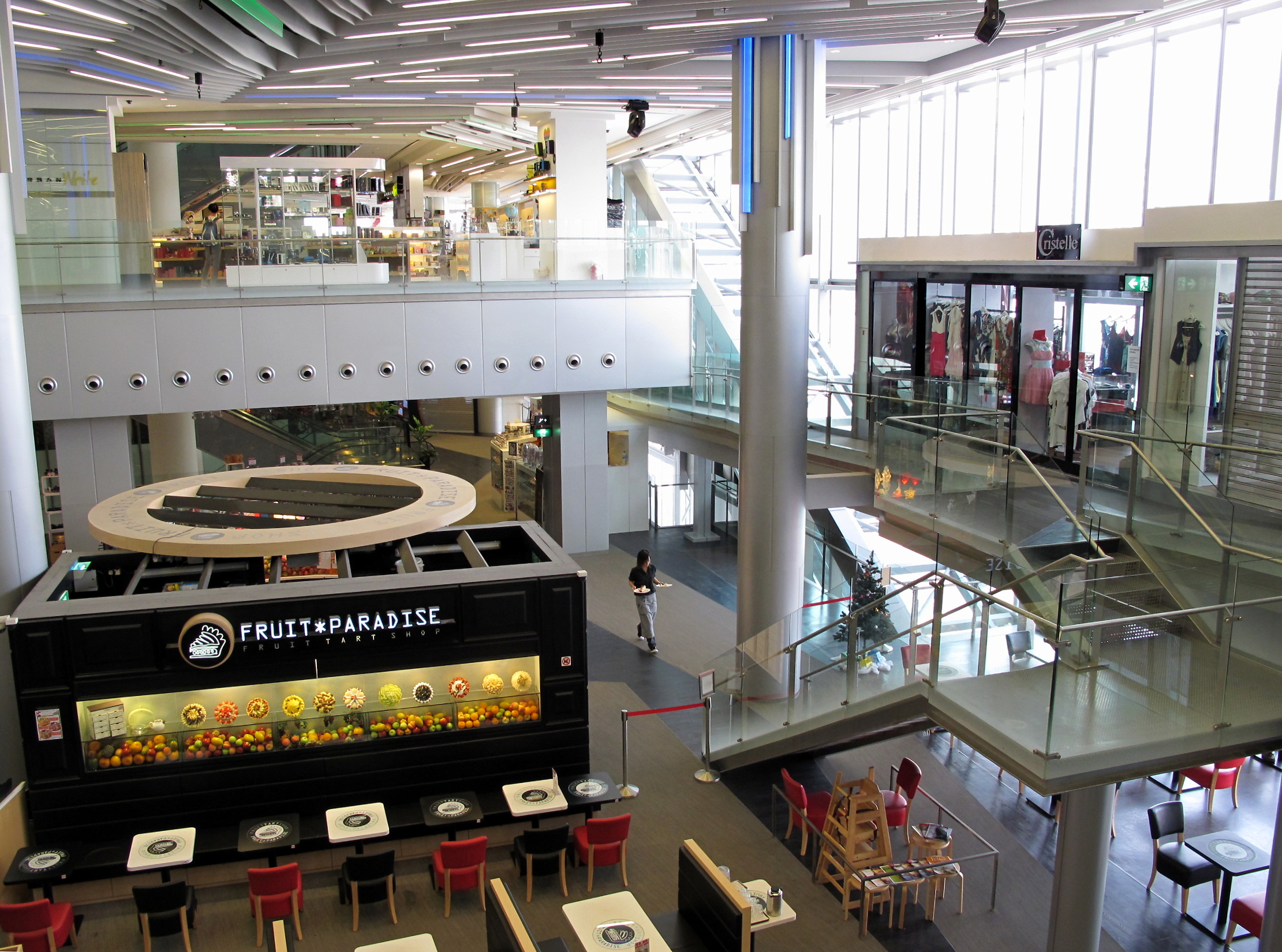
Level 4 have many small shops in 2010

Orchard Central is a shopping mall in Singapore located along the main shopping belt at Orchard Road. It sits on the land previously occupied by an open air carpark and has a 160m frontage along Orchard Road. It was officially opened on 2 July 2009. In December 2016, Forbes recognized Orchard Central as one of the top five shopping malls in Singapore.

== Architecture ==
Orchard Central was designed by DP Architects. It is designed as Singapore's first vertical mall, and it consists of 12 floors above ground and 2 basement levels. Unlike traditional mall designs, a central atrium is omitted. It also features a "super escalator", which takes pedestrians from the street level directly up to Level 4. The mall is served by a total of 52 escalators (including 6 super escalators) and 12 glass elevators.

The building has space for up to 400 stores, including flagship facilities for Uniqlo, the largest in Singapore, a 24 hours Don Don Donki store and Tokyu Hands. It also contains fourteen floors of space and numerous restaurants and cafes. The mall also contains a terminal for tourist buses, a tourist information center, currency exchanges and duty exemption services catering to tourists.

The mall features a 140-meter shopping street discovery walk and a green roof which are both open 24 hours to the public. Designed by Japanese design house Super Potato, the green roof features three large living walls and balcony rail on the 11th floor and two lower green walls on the 12th-floor roof terrace. There is also a biological pond located on the 12th storey of the green roof.

Other features of the mall includes open sided galleries and multiple atriums. The mall is connected to 313@Somerset and Orchard Gateway.

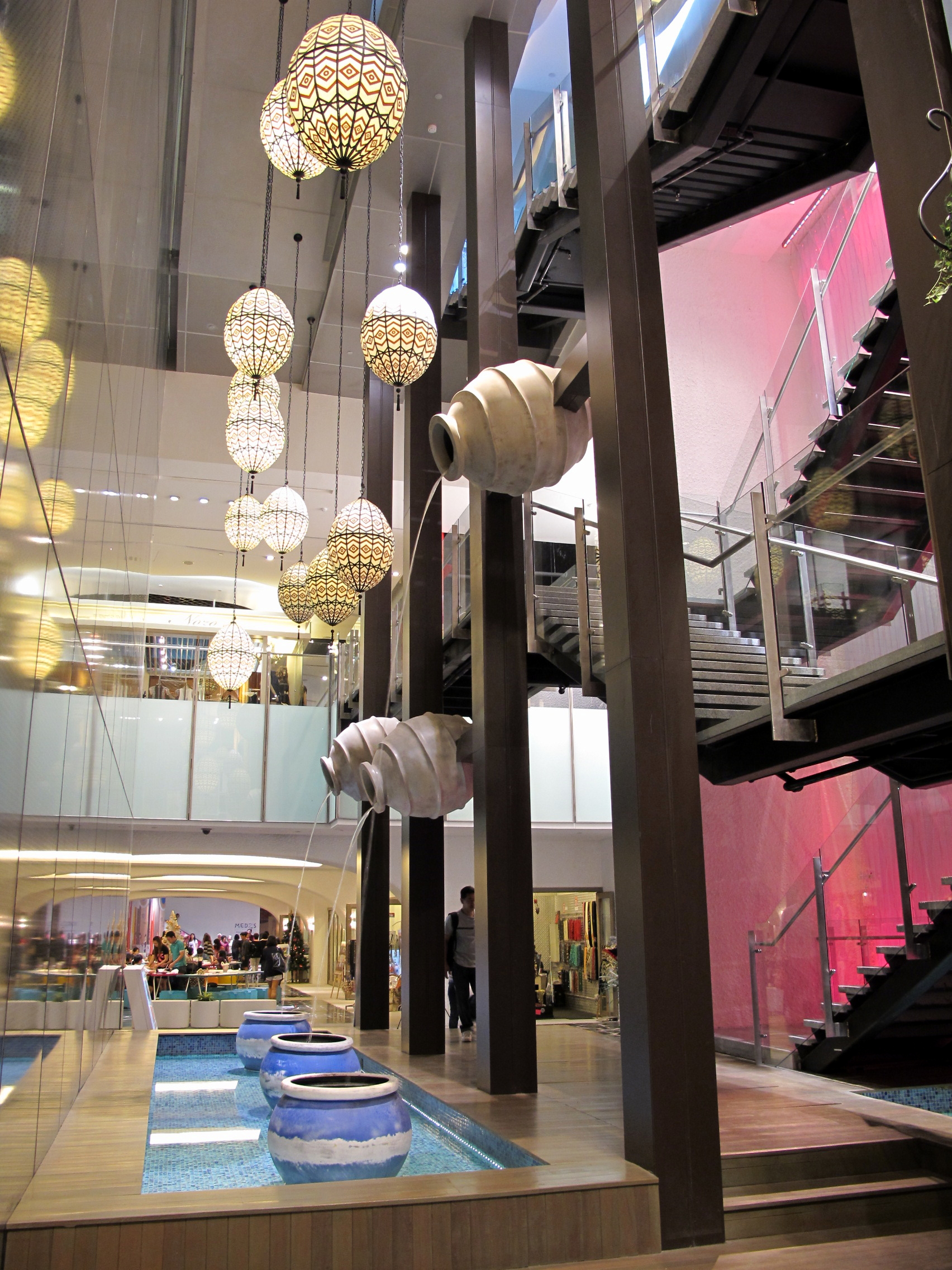
B2 the MED

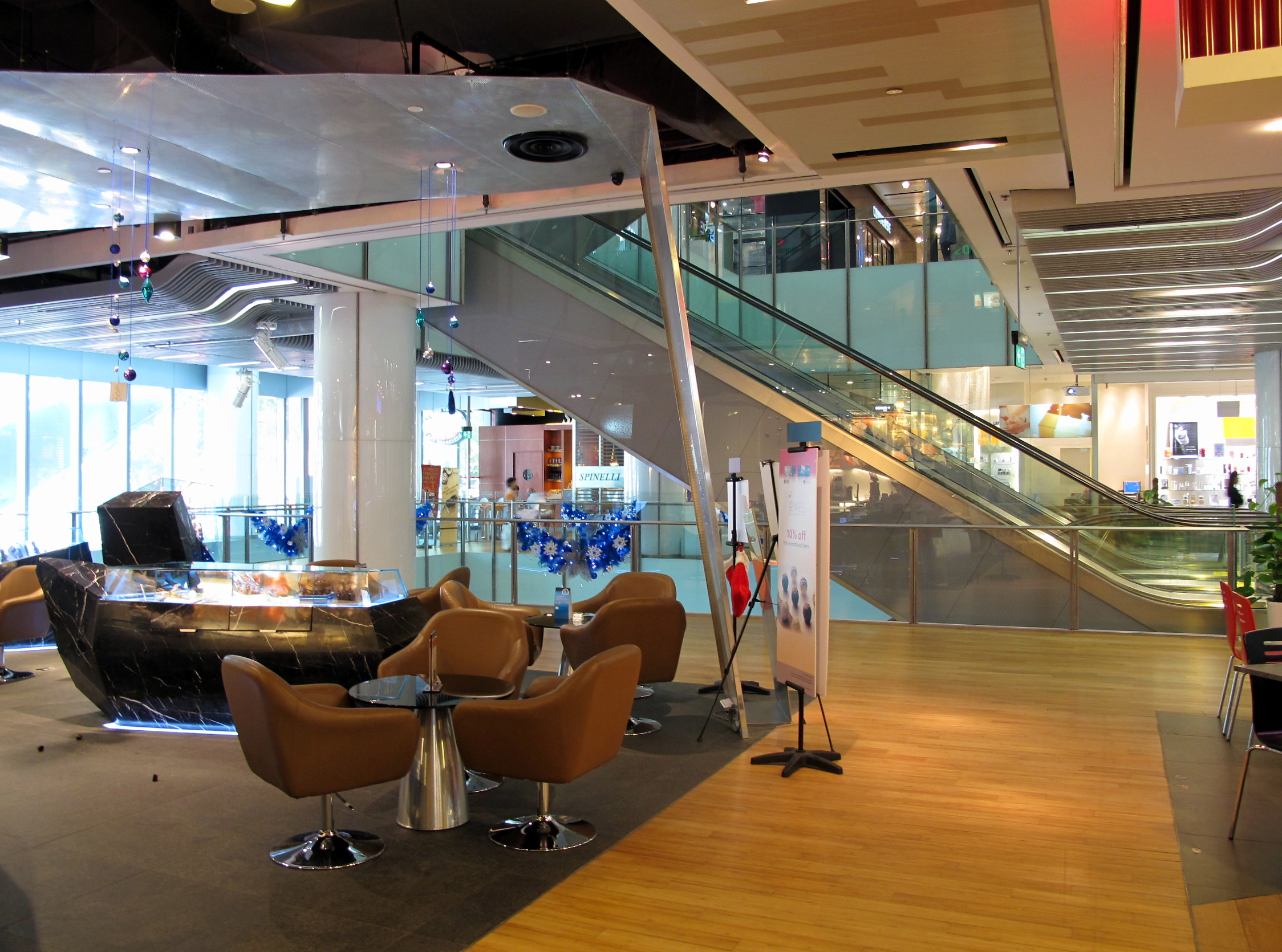
Level 2 shops

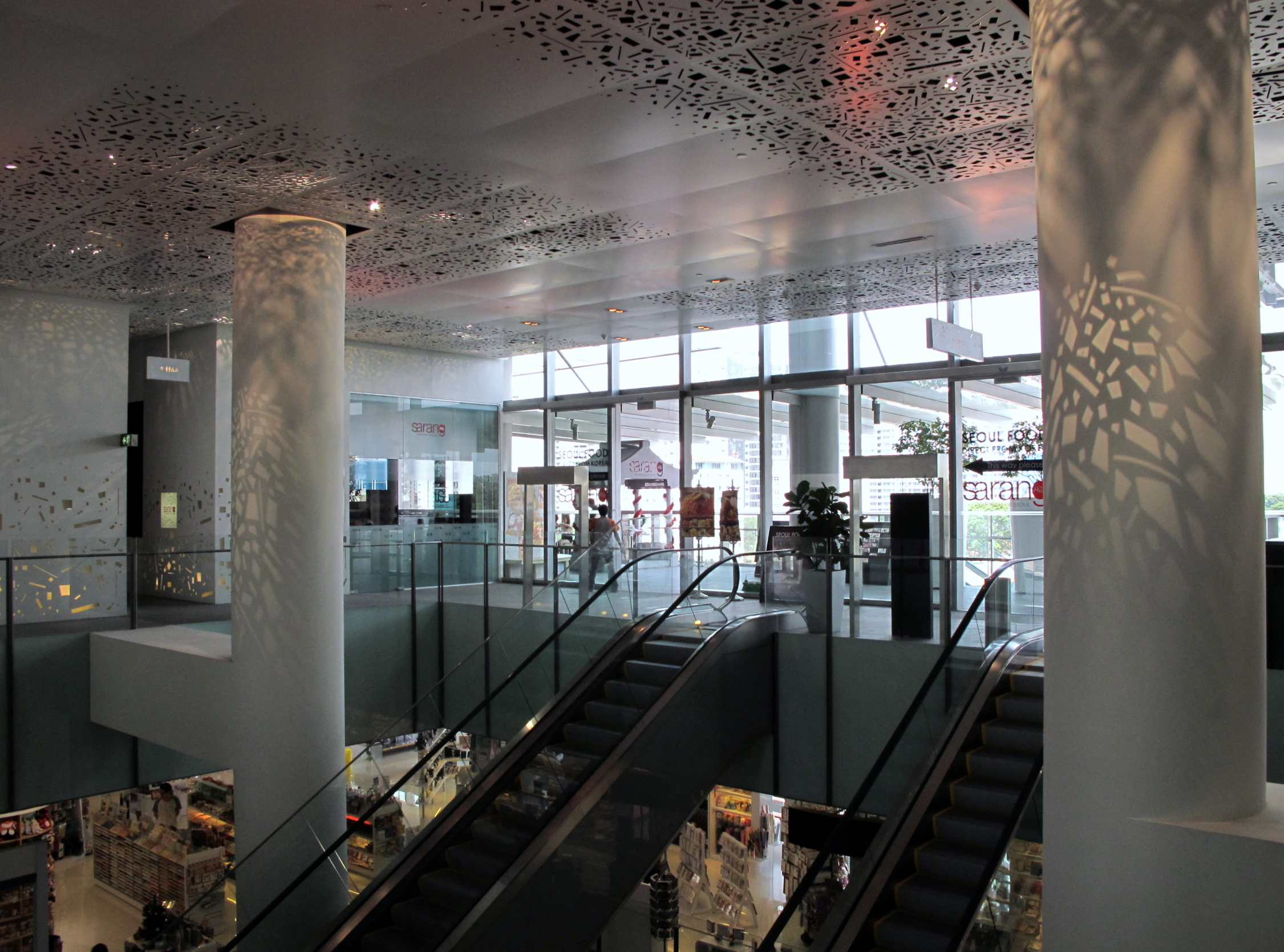
Level 7 restaurant

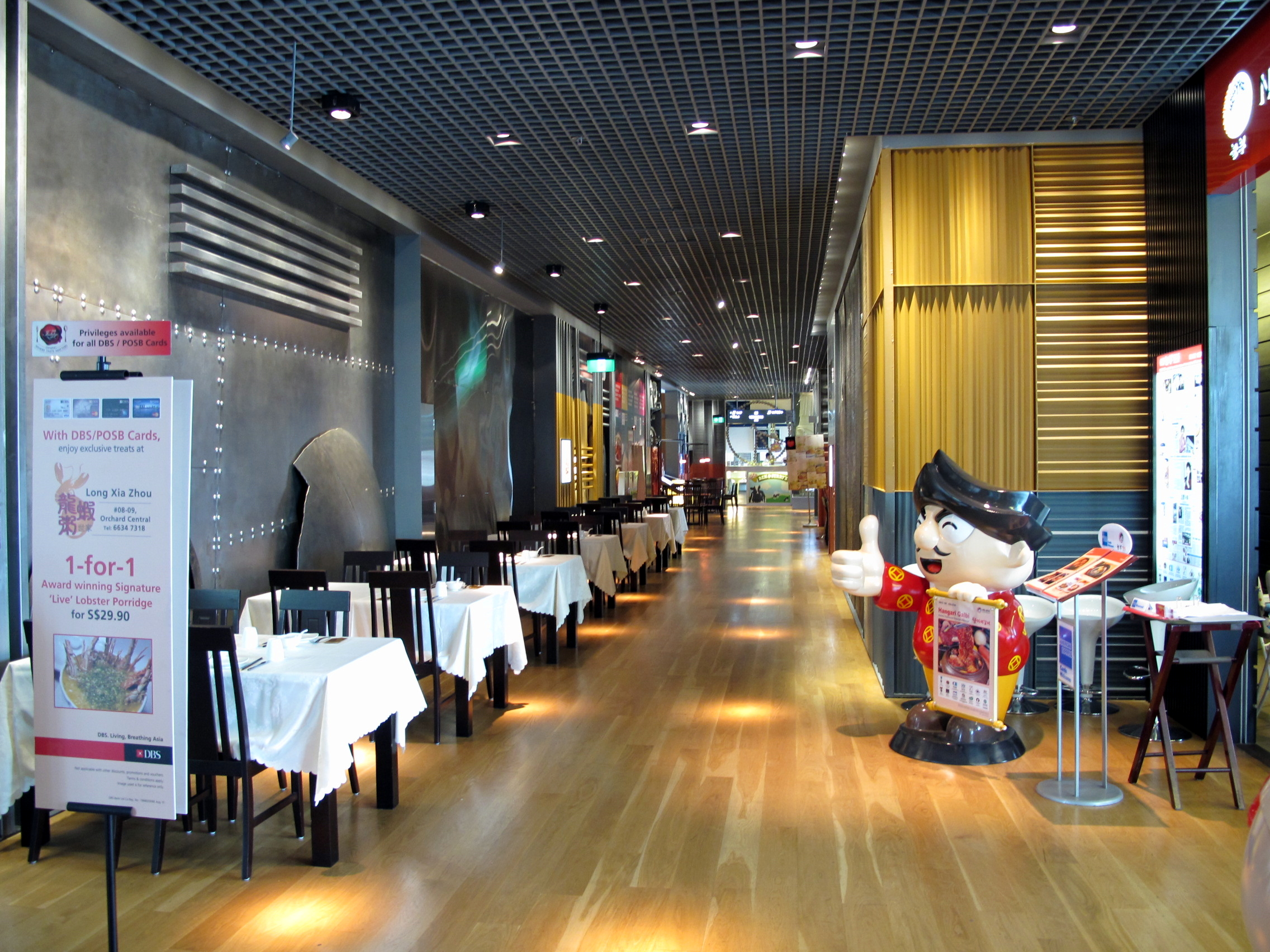
Level 8 restaurant

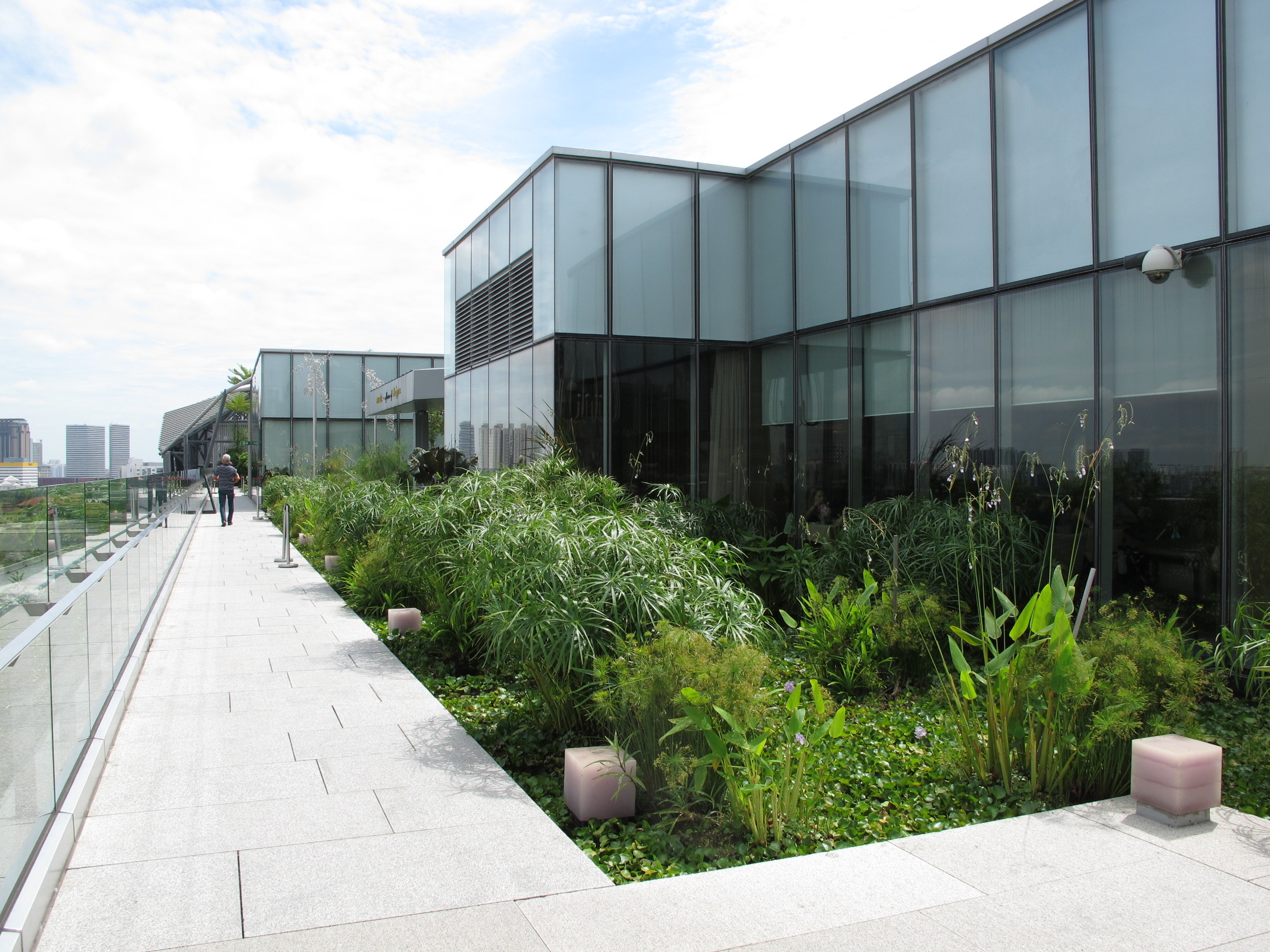
Rooftop garden

=== Art Trail ===
Orchard Central has artworks that are permanently displayed in clustered locations around the mall. The display is worth over SGD$9 million. Artworks featured in the display were curated by National Arts Council. The total development cost of the project is estimated to be more than SGD$650 million.

Artworks featured in this display were specially commissioned, and they were done by artists from countries such as the U.S., Japan, Australia and Denmark.

=== Office space ===
In July 2026, it was reported that the leases of the tenants on between the fifth and eighth floors, and eleventh and twelfth floors were not being renewed beyond November 2026 in preparation for a lease by Deloitte which is moving office into the retail belt.
