= Somerset MRT station =

Mass Rapid Transit station in Singapore

Somerset NS23 索美塞 சாமர்செட்
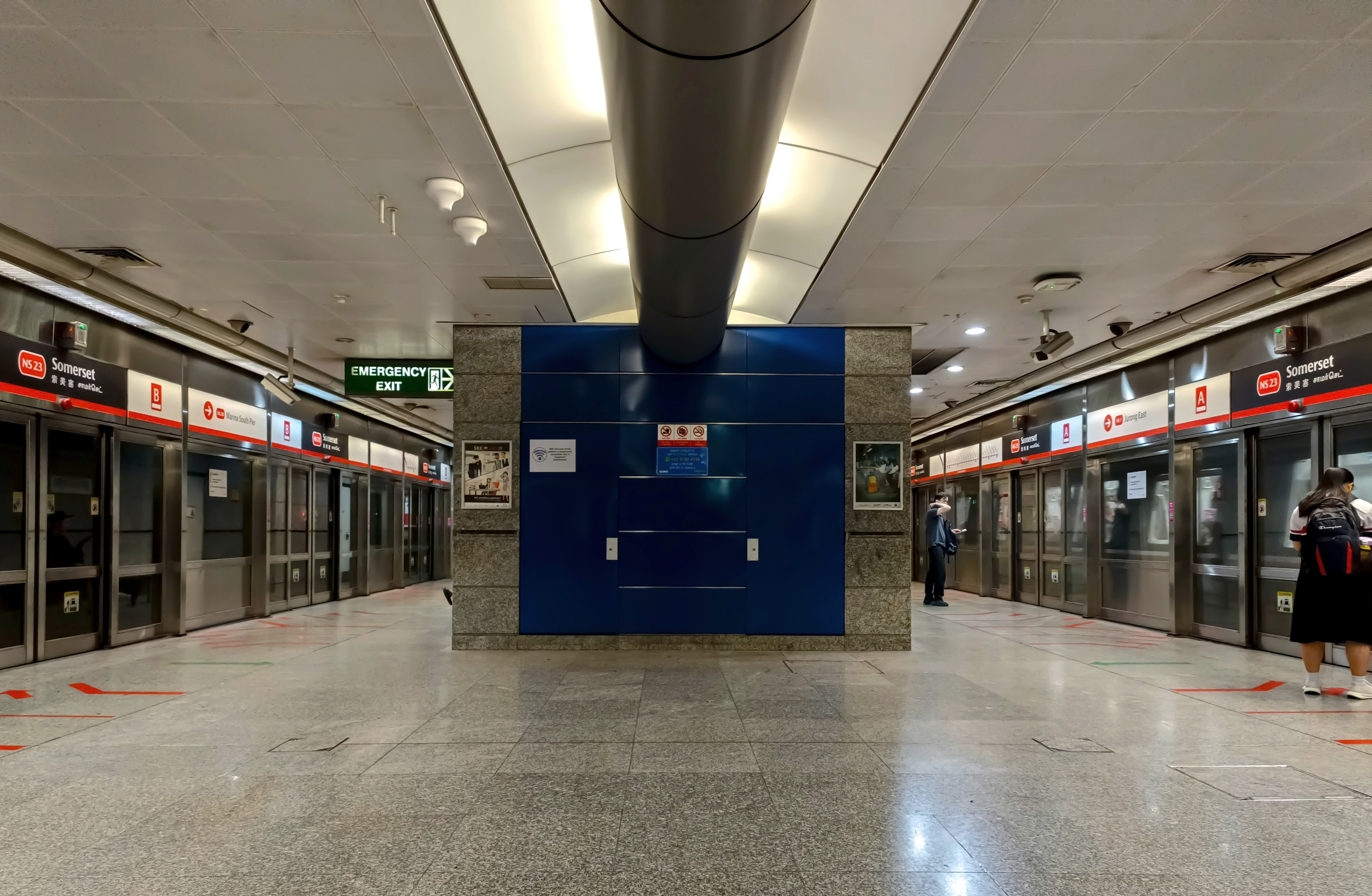
- Platform level of Somerset MRT station.

General information
- Location: 1 Somerset Road, Singapore 238162
- Coordinates: 01°18′01.85″N 103°50′20.50″E
- System: Mass Rapid Transit (MRT) station
- Owner: Land Transport Authority
- Operator: SMRT Trains
- Line: North–South Line
- Platforms: 2 (1 island platform)
- Tracks: 2
- Connections: Bus, Taxi

Construction
- Structure type: Underground
- Platform levels: 1
- Parking: Yes (Orchard Central, 313@somerset, Orchard Gateway)
- Cycle facilities: Yes
- Accessible: Yes

Other information
- Station code: SOM

History
- Opened: 12 December 1987; 38 years ago
- Former names: Killiney

Passengers
- June 2024: 29,381 per day

Services
Preceding station	Mass Rapid Transit	Following station
Orchard towards Jurong East	North–South Line	Dhoby Ghaut towards Marina South Pier
Track layout
Location
- Location within Singapore Rail central area

Somerset MRT station is an underground Mass Rapid Transit (MRT) station on the North–South Line in Orchard, Singapore. It is one of the three stations located along the popular shopping belt, Orchard Road.

The station connects to Comcentre, Singapore Power Building, Skate Park, 313@Somerset, Orchard Gateway, Orchard Central, Cathay Cineleisure Orchard, Centrepoint Shopping Centre, Mandarin Orchard, The Heeren, Faber House, Orchard Point, Peranakan Place and Emerald Hill.

Opened in 1987, Somerset station was part of the early plans for the original MRT network since 1982. It was constructed as part of Phase I of the MRT network. Following the network's operational split, the station has been served by the North–South Line since 1989.

== History ==
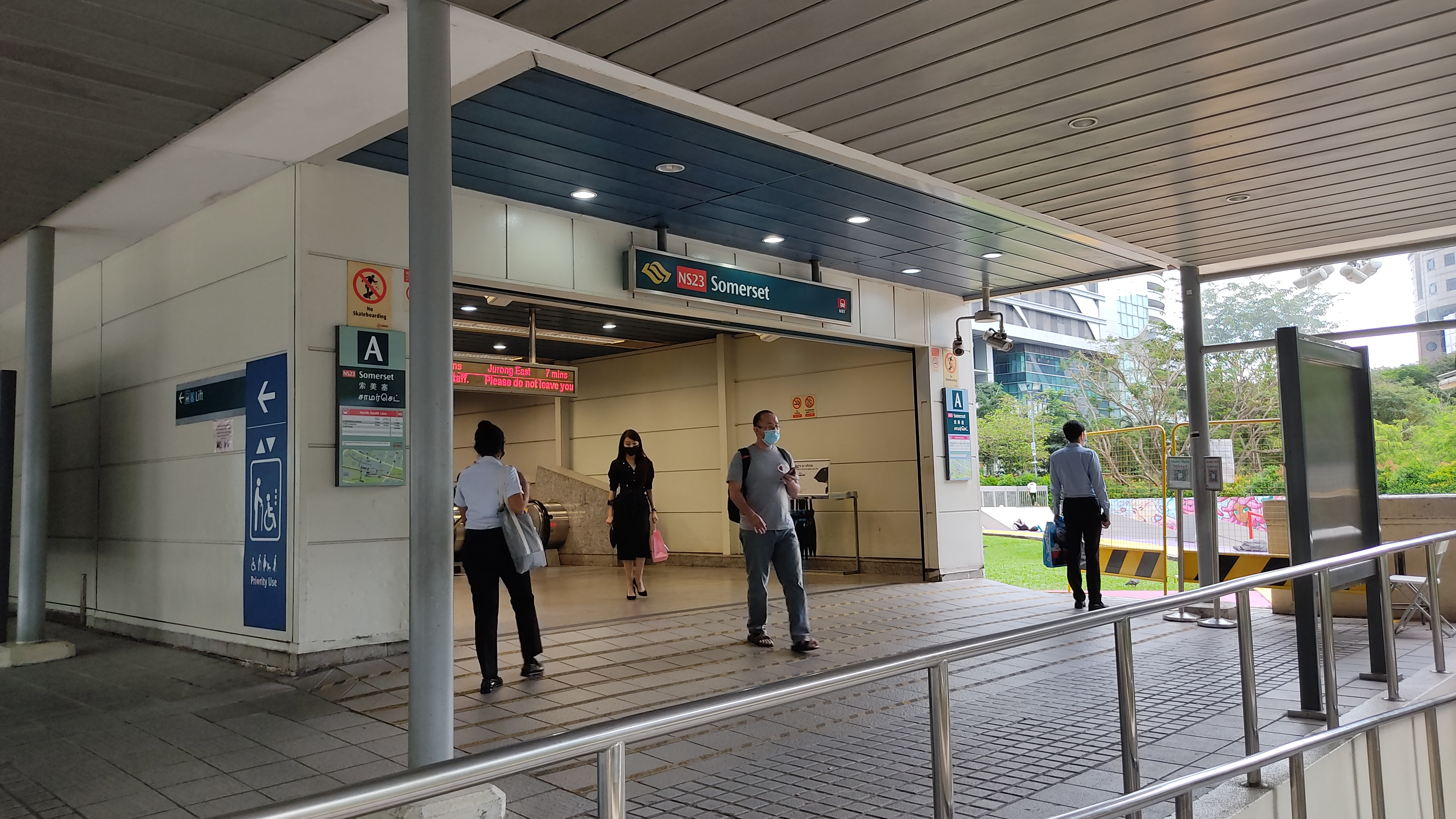
Exit A of Somerset station.

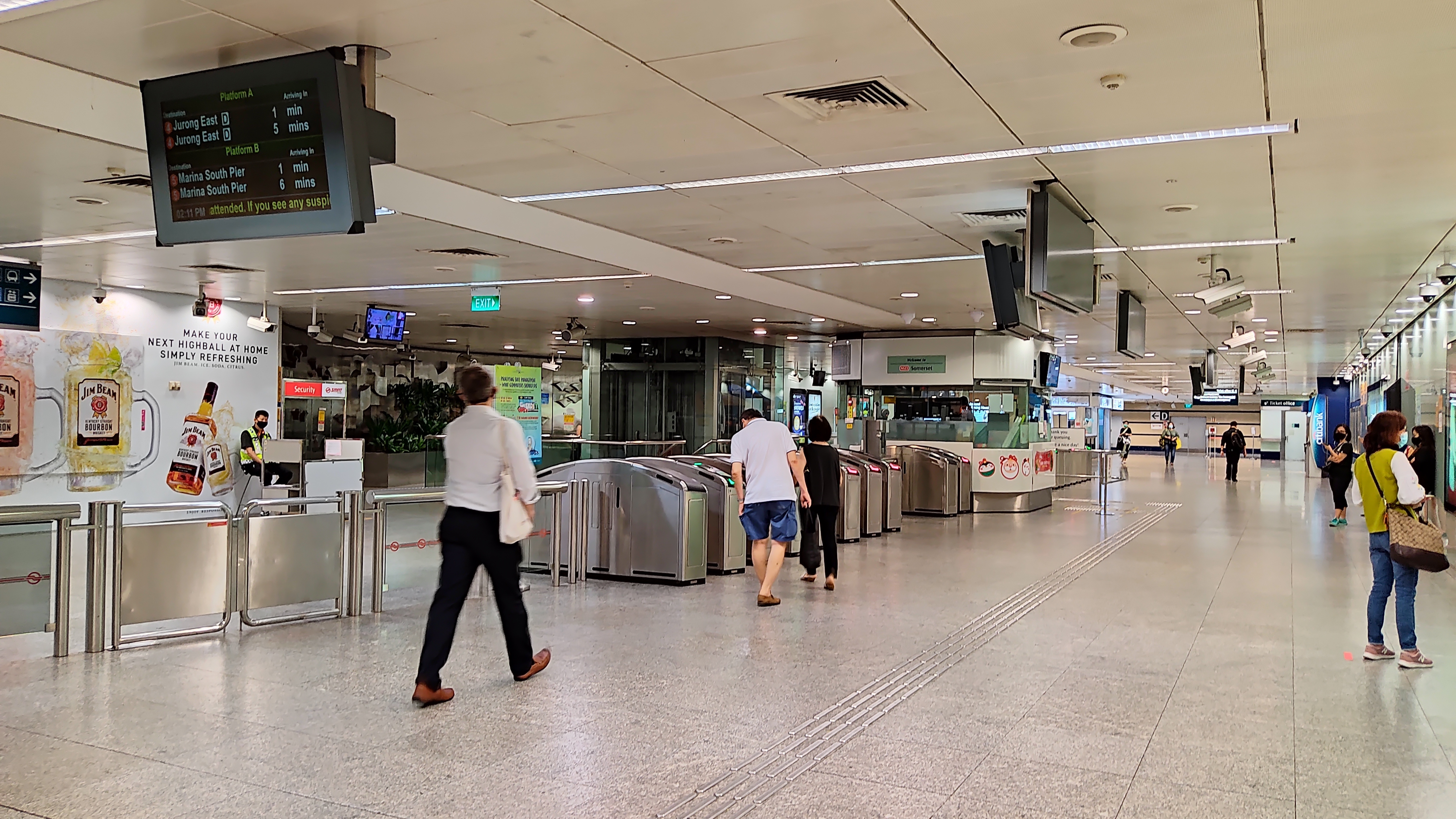
Concourse level of the station.

The station was built as part of the first phase of construction of the MRT system. Initially named Killiney, the station was renamed to its current name in November 1982 after Somerset Road, which runs above it. In January 1984, a joint venture between Borie SAE, Cogefar SPA, Traylor Bros and Ong Chwee Kou Building Contractors secured Contract 106A, the S$39.2 million contract to build Somerset station, since the joint venture was already handling construction of the tunnels adjacent to the station.

To facilitate the station's construction, the Urban Redevelopment Authority (URA) requisitioned the Ng Teow Yhee Building, which was located within the station site, in 1983, and Somerset Road was diverted in October 1984. Somerset station was opened on 12 December 1987 as part of the extension of the MRT network from Toa Payoh to Outram Park.

Somerset station was one of the first five MRT stations to be retrofitted with lifts and ramps in 2002, alongside enhancement works such as toilets for the disabled. (Note: The others were the Novena, Dhoby Ghaut, Outram Park and Somerset stations) These works, which cost S$81.5 million (US$45.5 million), were part of a system-wide programme to make the MRT network more wheelchair accessible. The programme comes after lobbying by the Handicaps Welfare Association. Exit B of the station was heavily renovated from January 2007 to July 2009. An additional entrance, Exit D, was opened in conjunction with Orchard Gateway on 25 April 2014 along with Exit C which also connects to Orchard Gateway.

== Station details ==
The station is located under Somerset Road and is near landmarks such as Orchard Central, 313@Somerset, Comcentre, the Centrepoint and 111 Somerset. It is served by the North–South Line, between Orchard and Dhoby Ghaut stations, and has the station code NS23, formerly N2.

Somerset station was designed to function as a bomb shelter, and was fitted out with blast doors and thick walls of reinforced concrete to withstand bomb impacts. Plants grown with the aid of hydroponics were planted in the station for aesthetic purposes.

=== Artwork ===
The station has a wall mural by local artists Leo Hee Tong and Ho Ho Ying. It was installed as part of the MRTC's S$2 million (US$3 million in 2022) commission of artworks at six MRT stations along the NSL.

There is another mural as part of the heritage-themed Comic Connect Public art display by SMRT. Managed by Lola Liu and created by Anthong "Antz" Chong, Marianne "Marihadalittlesheep" Tan, Sarah Keydence, and Rene Foo from the art school Visual Arts Centre and art group Playgroup Artists, the mural depicts landmarks in Somerset including the Sian Teck Tng temple, Killiney Road, and the Youth Park.

=== 2007 bomb hoax ===
A call was made from a public telephone at the station concourse at about 5pm on 26 September 2007 about a bomb at the station. The police arrested a 21-year-old man in connection with the incident two days later on the morning of 28 September 2007 after finding out that there was no bomb.
