= Liat Towers =

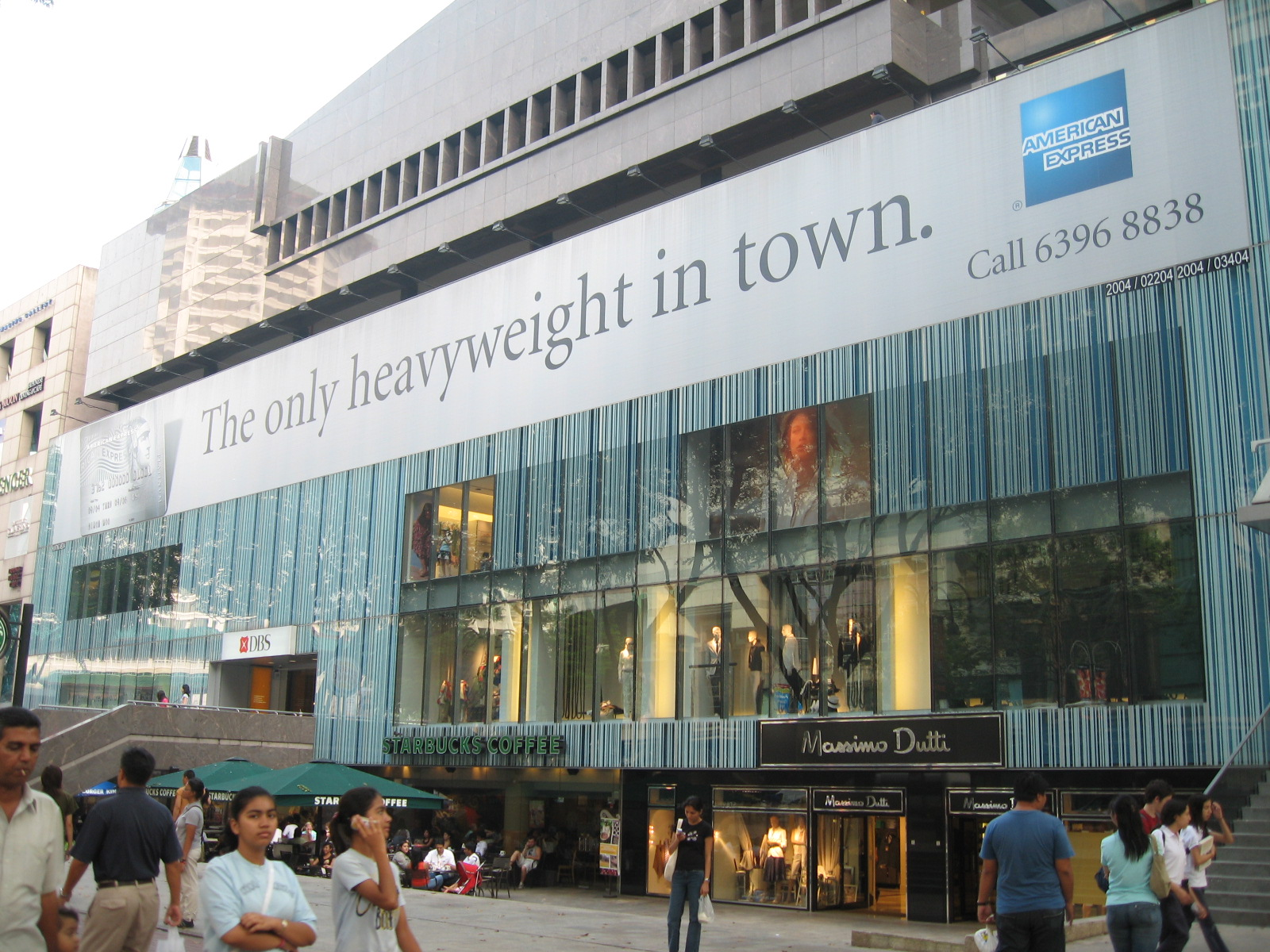
- Liat Towers, March 2006, with parts of Wheelock Place in the background
- Location: Singapore
- Coordinates: 1°18′19″N 103°49′50″E
- Address: 541 Orchard Road, Singapore 238881
- Opened: 11 September 1965; 61 years ago
- Renovated: 20 October 1979; 47 years ago
- Developer: Bonvests Holdings Limited
- Owner: Bonvests Holdings Limited
- Floor area: 400 to 5,500 square feet (37 to 511 m^{2})
- Floors: 21
- Parking: Yes
- Public transit: NS22 TE14 Orchard
- Website: www.liattowers.com

Liat Towers is a shopping mall and mixed-use complex in Orchard Road, Singapore. It has 21 floors with offices, foodservice outlets, retail stores and embassies. It is located close to Orchard MRT station. The building was first constructed in 1965, before it was redeveloped into its current state in 1979.

== History ==
Liat Towers first opened in September 1965, one of the first few malls to make its mark on Orchard Road. In 1977, a redevelopment was announced, which was completed in 1979.

=== First outlet milestones ===
The Liat Towers was the location of McDonald's first outlet in Singapore, which opened on 20 October 1979. It was also the first ever McDonald's outlet in a Southeast Asian country. The mall was also the location of Starbucks' first outlet in Singapore, opening in December 1996. Similar to the McDonald's outlet, it was the first ever Starbucks outlet in a Southeast Asian country. It was also the coffeehouse chain's second ever overseas outlet outside of the United States, a time whereby Starbucks was not yet a household name. Starbucks still exists at Liat Towers, and its outlet was renovated in 2019.

== Description ==
The stores in the tower range from 400 to 5,500 square feet (37 to 511 m^{2}) in floor area. Some tenant retailers include Massimo Dutti, Zara, Hermes, and famed luxury watch brand Audemars Piguet. Zara closed down the outlet in June 2022 and was replaced by Castlery which was relocated from Delta House in 2015 - 2018 and Jit Poh Building from 2019 to September 2022. It has a car park, and is in the middle of the prestigious Orchard shopping district of Singapore.

The tower is also close by to other retail and service buildings in the city, such as several hotels, the most prominent example being the Mandarin Orchard Singapore, along with several well-known malls such as Ngee Ann City, Wisma Atria, ION Orchard and Hilton Singapore. Some of the restaurants in Liat Towers include Shake Shack, which occupies the same spot where Singapore's first McDonald's once stood. (Note: The McDonald's outlet at Liat Towers closed its operations a decade after its opening in October 1989. It was subsequently replaced by a Burger King and a Wendy's before Shake Shack began operations in August 2020.)

== Gallery ==
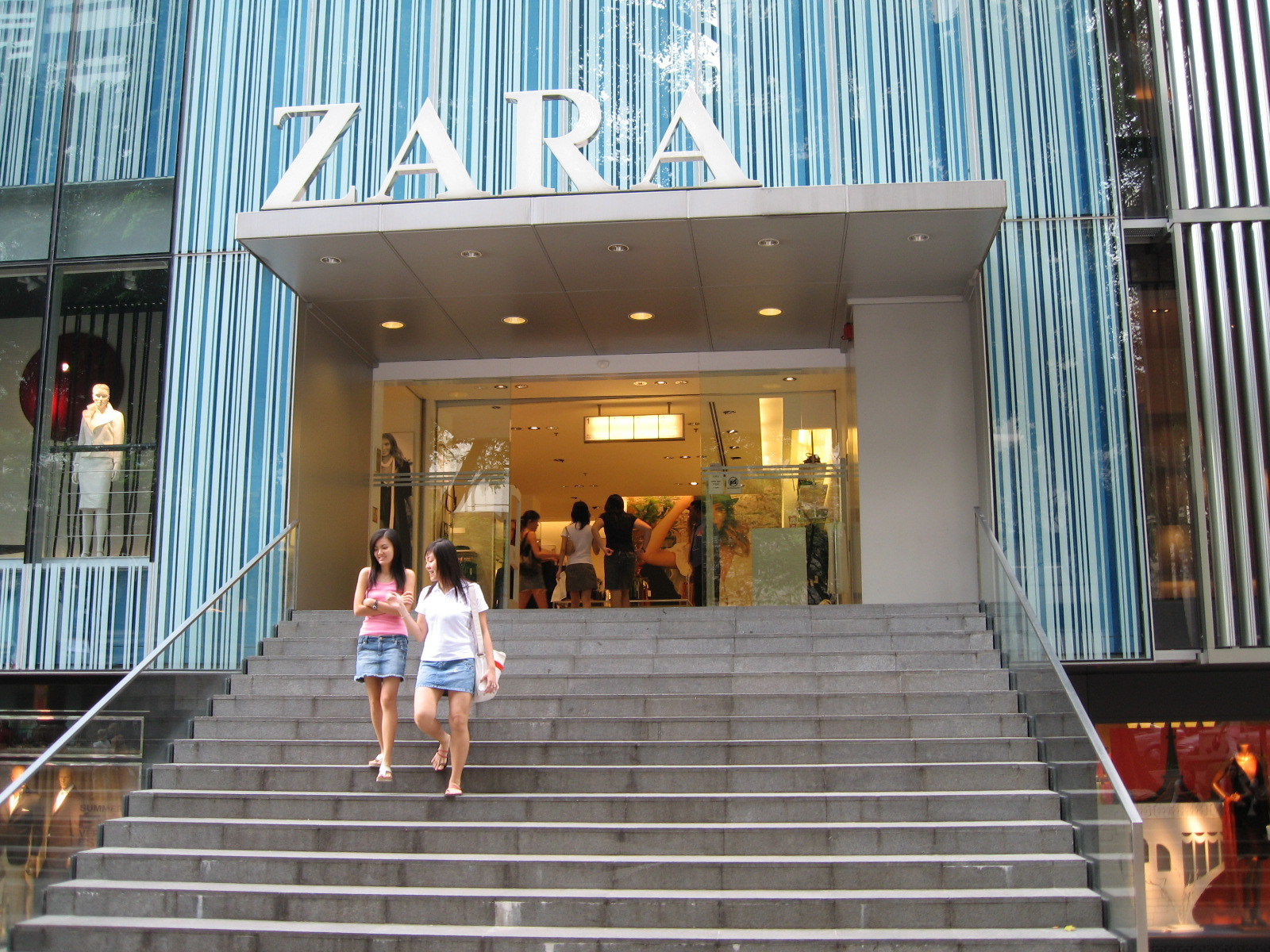
Zara, one of the tenants near the entrance of the tower

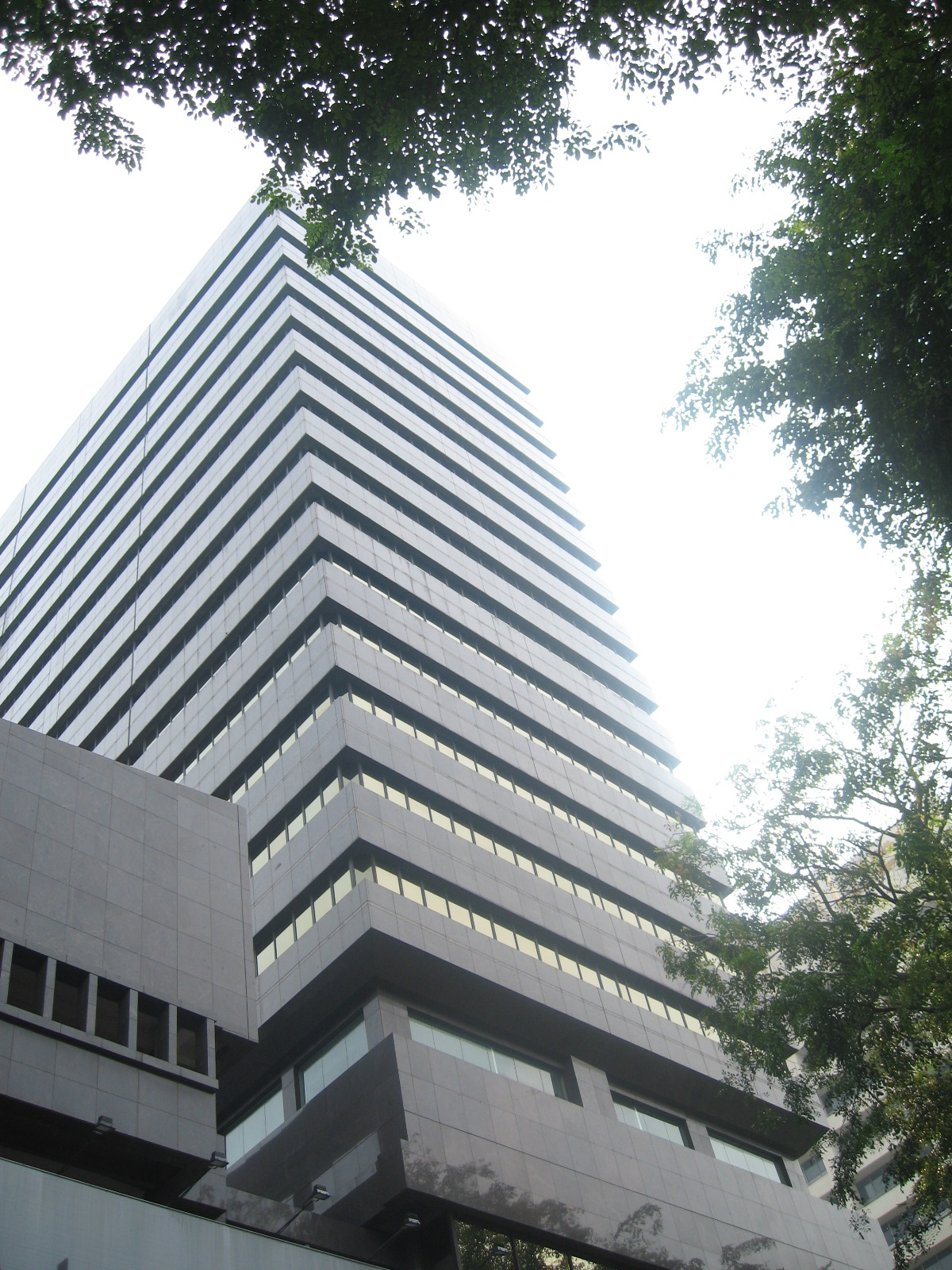
The office tower

== See also ==
- Ngee Ann City
- Wisma Atria
- ION Orchard
- Orchard MRT station
- Hilton Singapore
- List of shopping malls in Singapore
- 1979 in Singapore
