= Voco Orchard Singapore =

Voco hotel in Singapore

voco Orchard Singapore
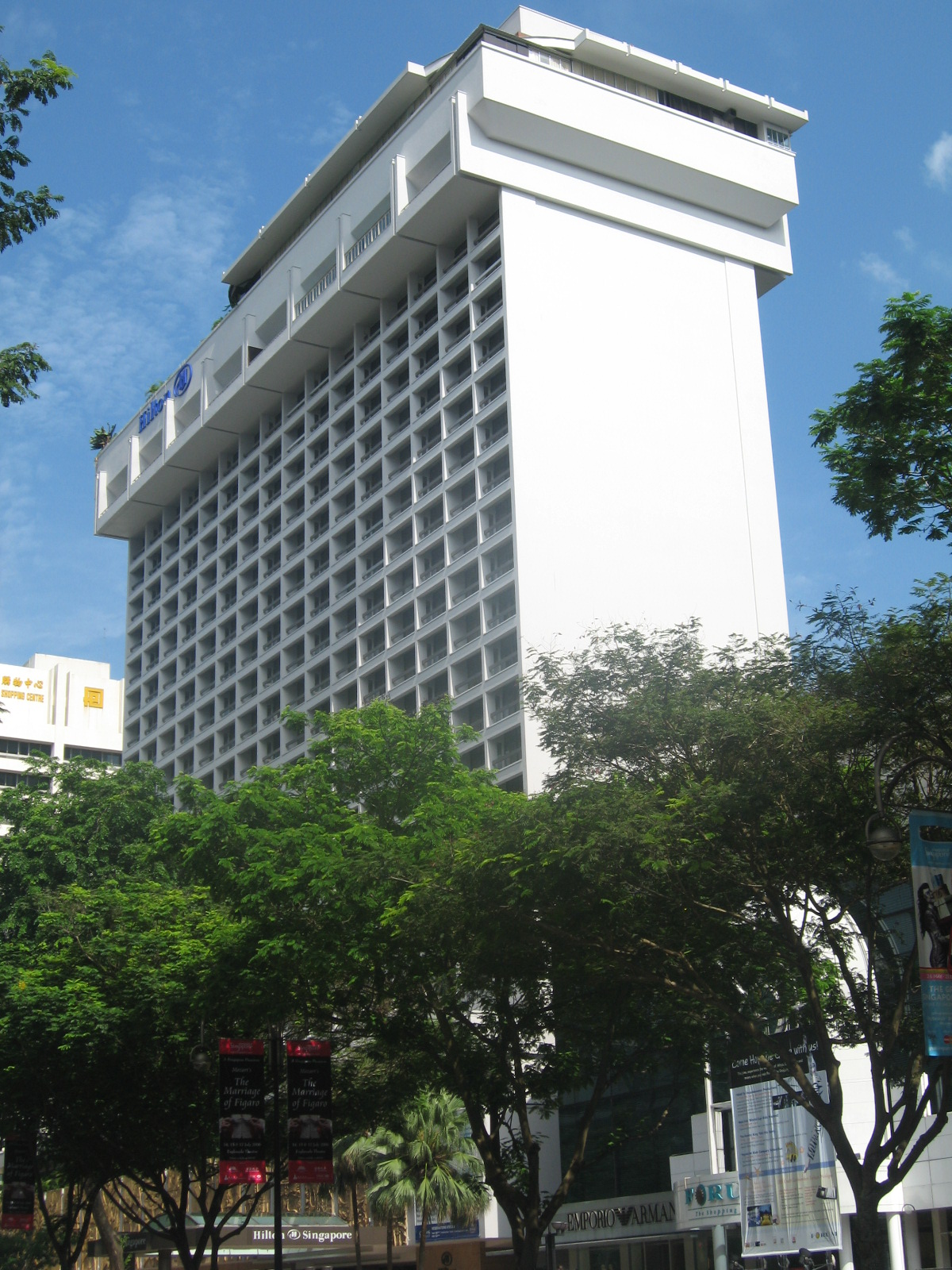

General information
- Status: Completed
- Type: Hotel
- Architectural style: High-rise
- Location: Orchard Road, Singapore
- Coordinates: 1°18′21.09″N 103°49′45.38″E
- Operator: IHG Hotels & Resorts

voco Orchard Singapore is a voco hotel in located at Orchard Road, Singapore. It is the first voco-branded hotel by InterContinental Hotels Group in Southeast Asia.

== History ==
The construction of the Singapore Hilton was announced in The Straits Times on 1 November 1963, along with its sister hotel, the Kuala Lumpur Hilton. Singapore had joined as one of the states in the new nation of Malaysia only weeks before. The two hotels were financed by businessman Cho Jock Kim, head of Far East Publishers. The $18 million hotel was designed by local architects Booty Edwards & Partners. Completion was intended for 1965, but Singapore left Malaysia that year, and by November 1965, only the pilings of the structure had been completed.

Construction resumed in 1968 and the Far East Organization, owned by billionaire Ng Teng Fong, listed the hotel on the Stock Exchange of Malaysia and Singapore in August 1968, through its Far Eastern Hotels Development Ltd. subsidiary. A topping off ceremony was held on 23 September 1969. Interior design work was done by Dale Keller, of Pacific House (Asia) Limited and the hotel featured a huge 19-panel facade mural, sculpted by local artist Gerard Henderson and a 25-foot solid aluminum lobby mural by artist Seah Kim Joo. The partly-completed hotel opened 100 of its 448 rooms in March 1970.

The Singapore Hilton celebrated its grand opening on 30 January 1971, officiated by Minister for Foreign Affairs and Minister for Labour S. Rajaratnam. Hilton International operated as a separate business from Hilton in the US after 1964, and its properties were rebranded in 1979, with the hotel renamed the Hilton International Singapore. In 1980, the hotel was sold to billionaire Ong Beng Seng. Hilton re-acquired Hilton International in 2005 and the Hilton International branding was retired in 2006, when the hotel became the Hilton Singapore.

On 13 December 2015, the ceiling of the hotel entrance collapsed and debris fell into a car. 4 people were sent to hospital. According to the Building and Construction Authority, the building's structure remained intact and was not affected by the collapse of the false ceiling.

On 1 January 2022, the hotel was rebranded as voco Orchard Singapore, marking its transition into the voco brand under InterContinental Hotels Group (IHG). The rebranding forms part of IHG’s broader strategy to expand its upscale voco brand across the Asia-Pacific region, introducing the brand to Singapore’s Orchard Road district.

Following the transition, the hotel adopted voco’s brand hallmarks, which emphasise distinctive guest experiences, locally inspired character, and sustainability-focused initiatives in line with IHG’s global standards.

== Location ==
voco Orchard Singapore is located on 581 Orchard Road Singapore 238883. The nearest MRT station is Orchard MRT Station, which serves North-South Line and Thomson East Coast Line. It is approximately 650 meters away and less than 10-minutes walk. The walking route includes a sheltered walkway via Wheelock Place. The nearest shopping mall is the iconic ION Orchard, Wheelock Place, Ngee Ann City, Takashimaya and Paragon.

== Accommodation and facilities ==
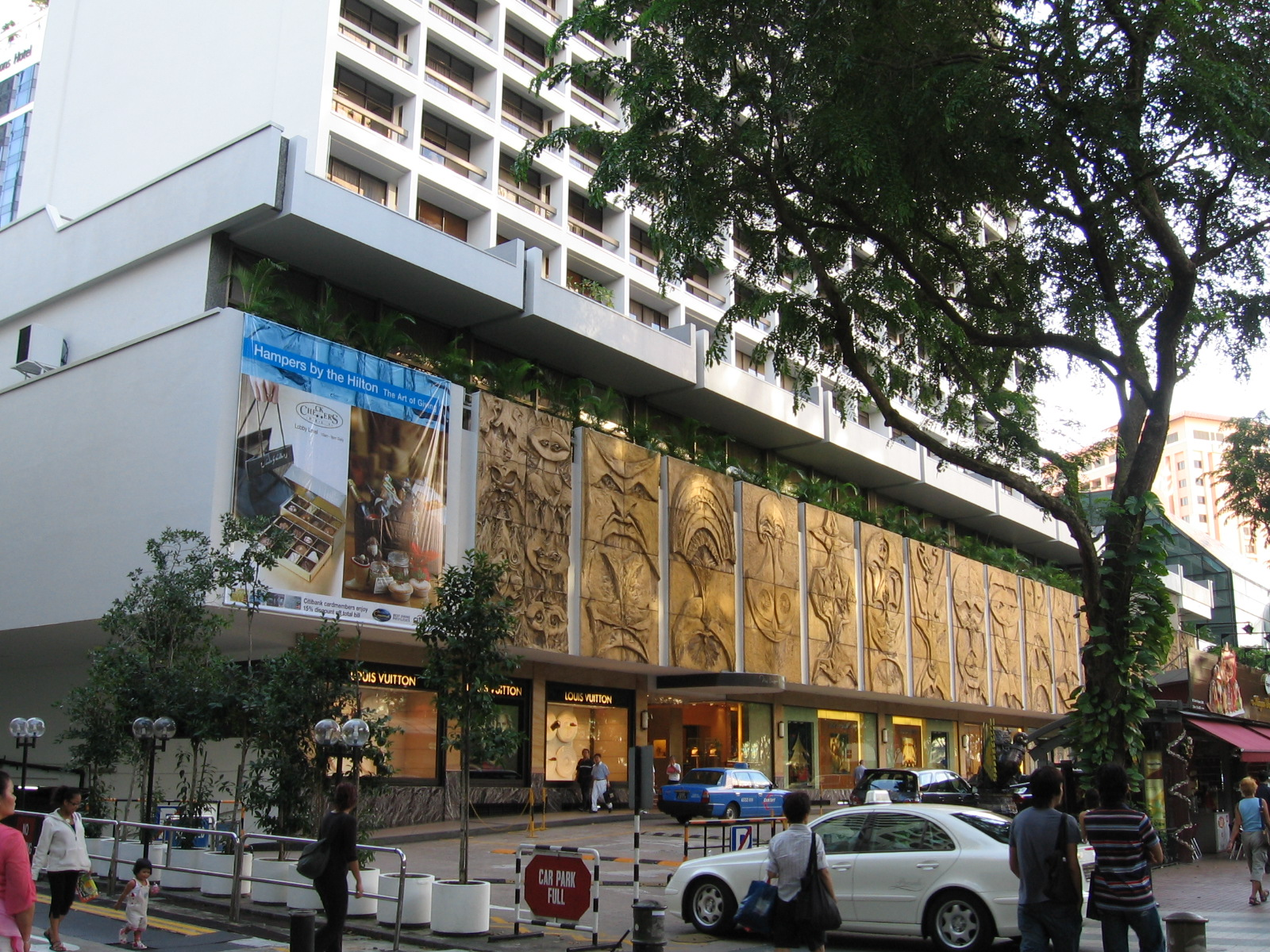
The facade along Orchard Road, showing the large multi-panel Gerard Henderson mural

The hotel has 423 guest rooms, a rooftop swimming pool, a 24-hour fitness centre, four dining venues, 17 meeting rooms accommodating between 18 and 550 people, and a Club Lounge. Situated in the heart of Orchard Road, a popular entertainment and shopping district, the hotel is located near major shopping centres including ION Orchard and Takashimaya. It is approximately 20 minutes from Singapore Changi Airport and is near several of Singapore’s attractions.

== Sustainability ==
voco Orchard Singapore has obtained certification from a Global Sustainable Tourism Council (GSTC)-accredited certification body, indicating alignment with internationally recognised standards for sustainable tourism. The hotel has implemented measures such as reducing single-use plastics, adopting water- and energy-efficiency systems, and incorporating sustainable sourcing practices in its operations.

== Access ==
The hotel is linked to Four Seasons Hotel via a link bridge.

== See also ==
- Iggy's, a fine-dining restaurant within the hotel
