= The Orchard Residences =

Residential skyscraper in Singapore

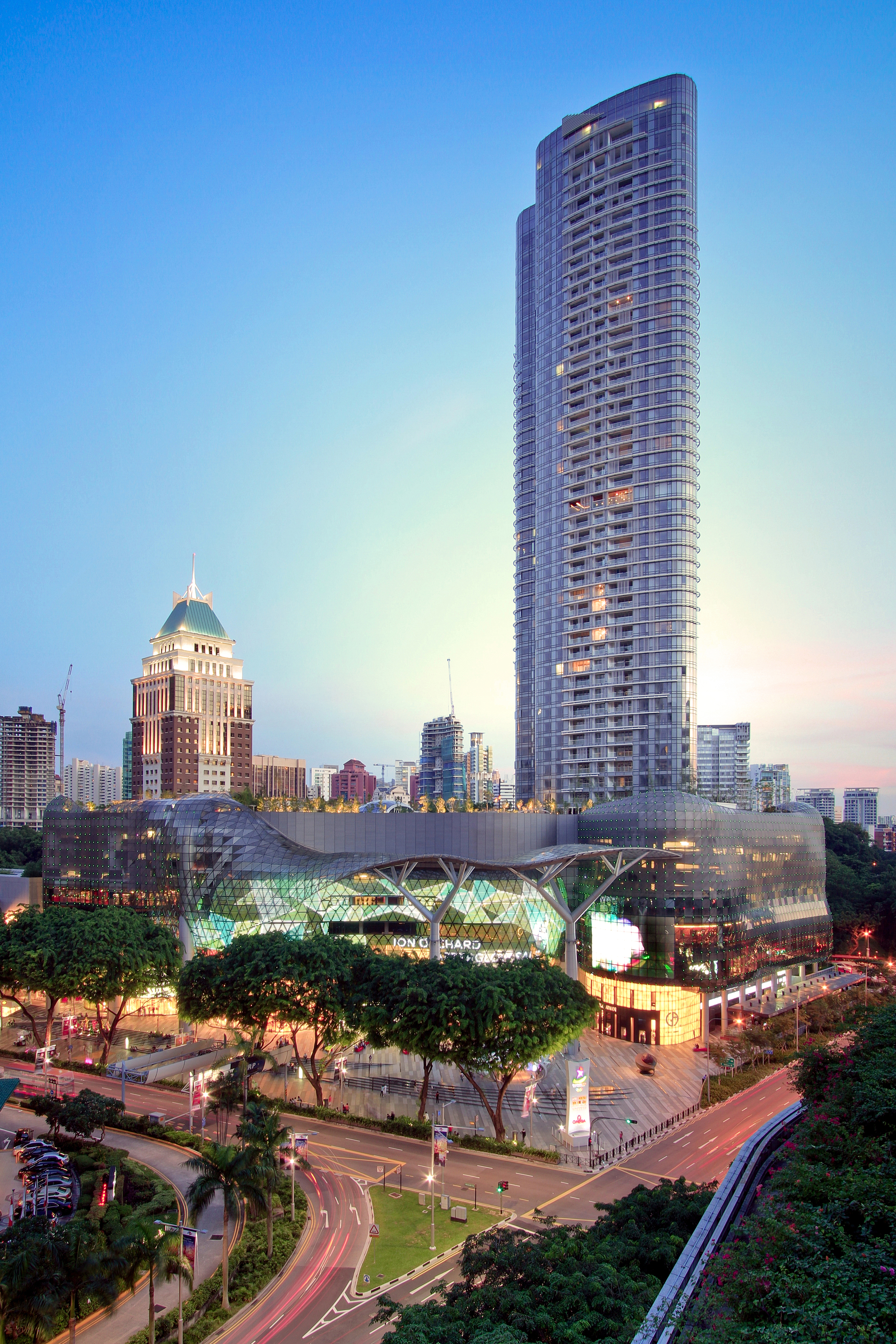
- Interactive map of the The Orchard Residences area
- Alternative names: Orchard Turn

General information
- Status: Completed
- Type: Residential condominiums
- Location: 238 Orchard Boulevard, Singapore 237973
- Coordinates: 1°18′15.01″N 103°49′54.2″E
- Completed: 2010; 16 years ago
- Owner: Orchard Turn Developments Pte Ltd
- Operator: Orchard Turn Developments Pte Ltd

Height
- Roof: 218 m (715 ft)

Technical details
- Floor count: 56, including 4 basement floors
- Floor area: 125,000 m^{2} (1,350,000 sq ft)
- Lifts/elevators: 5

Design and construction
- Architect: RSP Architects Planners & Engineers (Pte) Ltd.
- Developer: Orchard Turn Developments Pte Ltd (A joint venture company between CapitaLand and Sun Hung Kai Properties)
- Structural engineer: RSP Architects Planners & Engineers (Pte) Ltd.
- Main contractor: Penta Ocean

Other information
- Number of units: 177

Website
- www.theorchardresidences.com

The Orchard Residences, a 56-storey, 218 m (715 ft), high-rise residential condominium, completed in 2010 is the residential component of an integrated retail and residential development by Orchard Turn Developments Pte Ltd, a joint venture between CapitaLand and Sun Hung Kai Properties.

Located along the prime shopping district of Singapore on Orchard Road. The tower is the tallest building along the shopping district, and has 175 residential units from the ninth to the 54th floor, with four penthouse apartments. During the first phase of the sale, 98 units were sold for an average of S$3213 per sq ft.

ION Orchard shopping mall, the retail component completed together with the project, has 335 food and retail outlets.

== See also ==
- Orchard Road
- Orchard MRT station
