= ION Orchard =

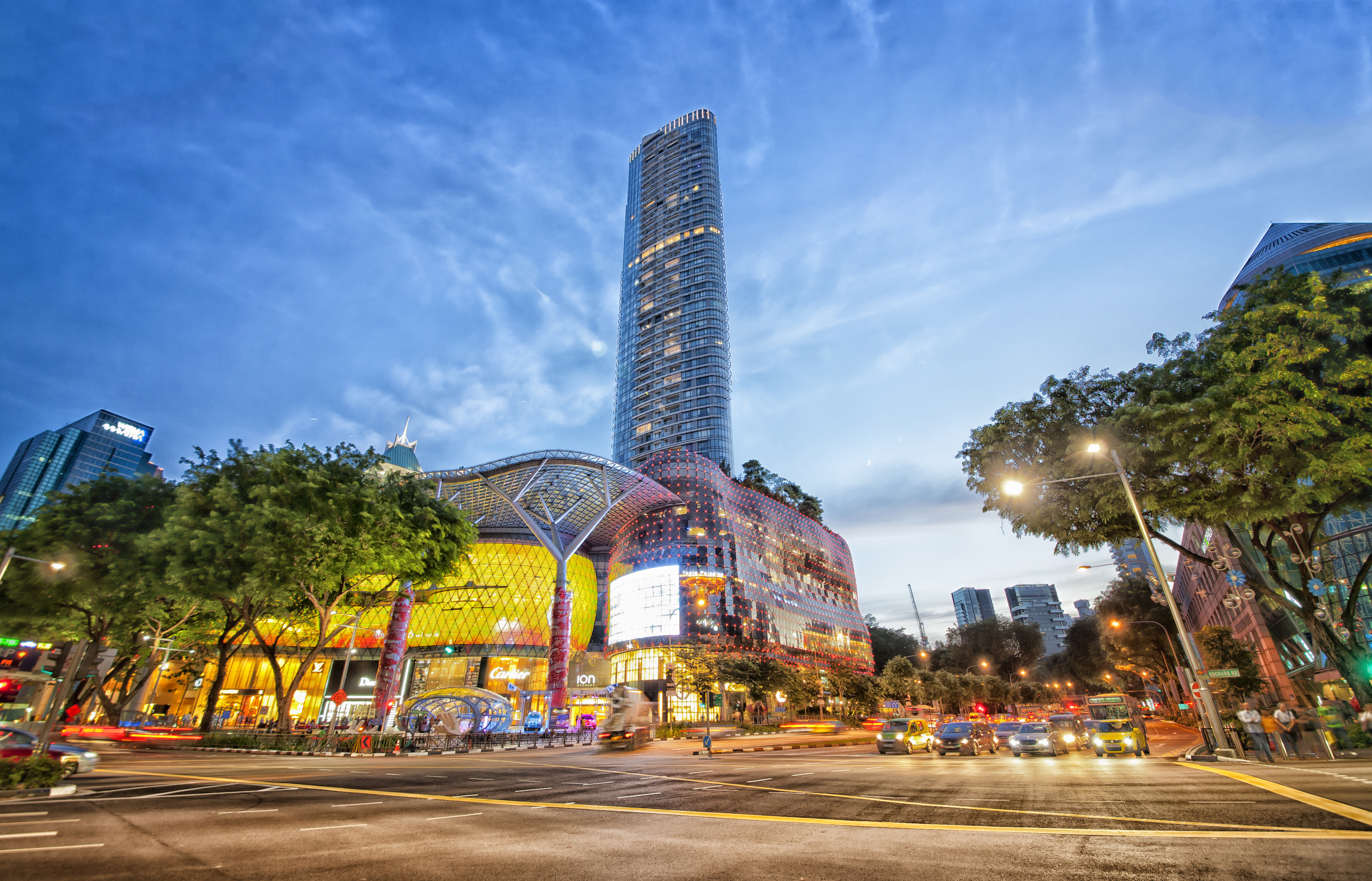
- Location: Singapore
- Coordinates: 1°18′16″N 103°49′54″E
- Address: 2 Orchard Turn, Singapore 238801
- Opened: 21 July 2009; 17 years ago (operational); 23 October 2009; 17 years ago (official)
- Developer: Orchard Turn Developments Pte Ltd (A joint venture company between CapitaLand and Sun Hung Kai Properties)
- Manager: Orchard Turn Developments Pte Ltd
- Owner: Orchard Turn Developments Pte Ltd
- Architect: List: RSP Architects Planners & Engineers; Benoy
- Num. of stores: 400
- Floor area: 941,700 square feet (87,490 m^{2})
- Floors: 12 (8 retail and 4 car park)
- Public transit: NS22 TE14 Orchard
- Website: ionorchard.com

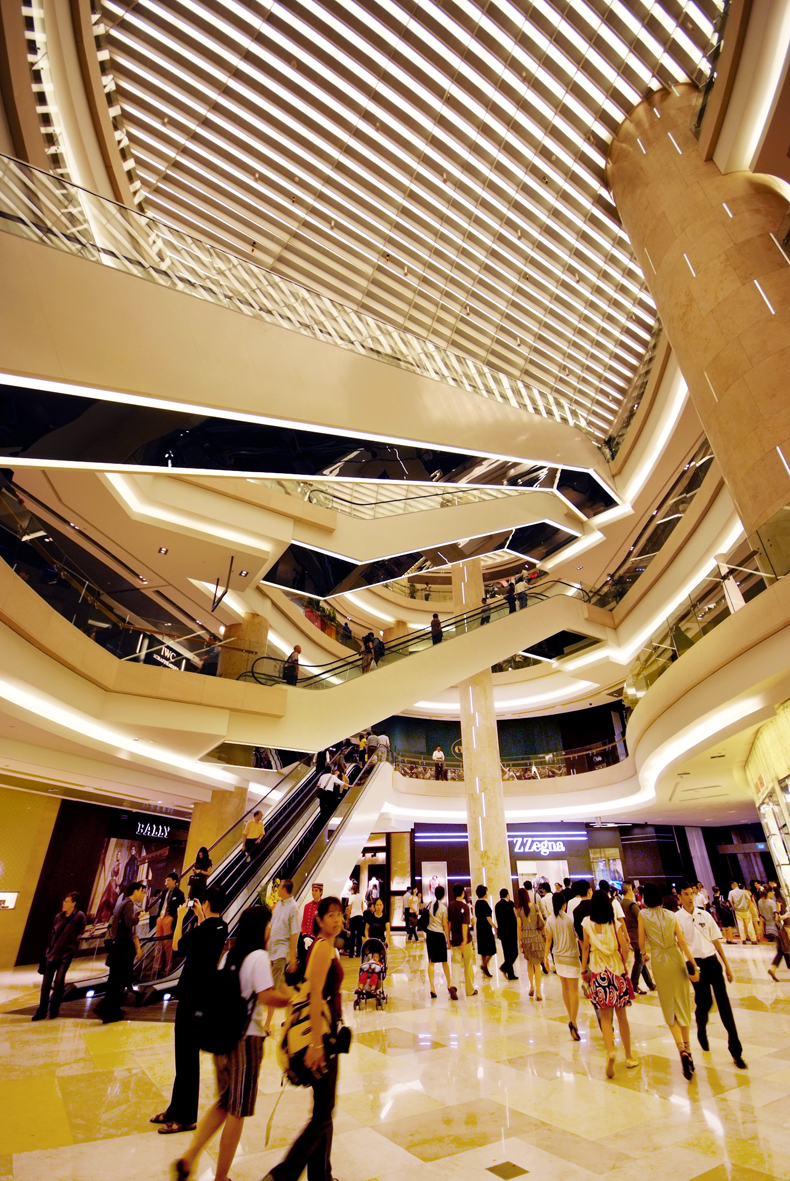
ION Orchard Atrium

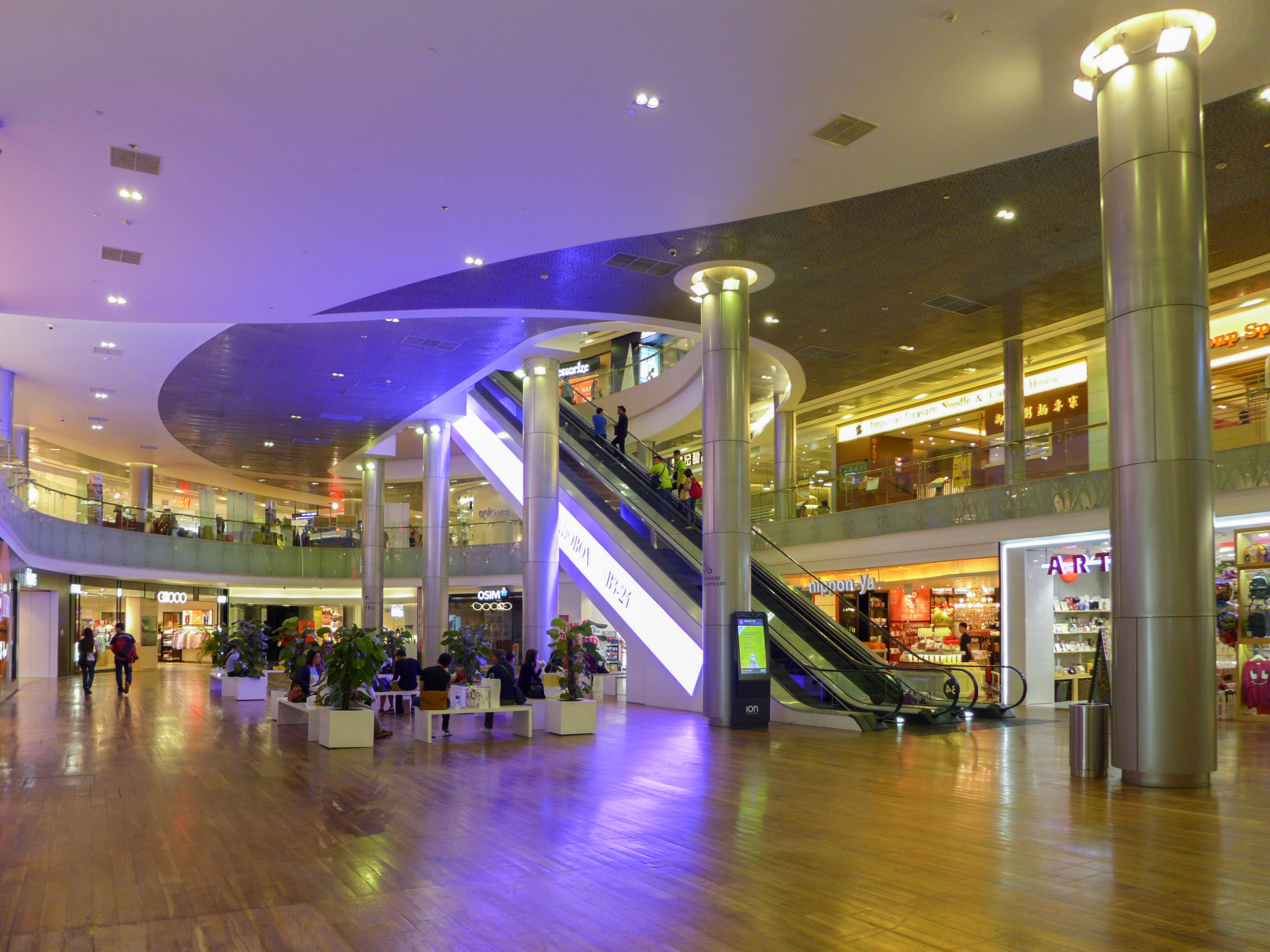
B4 Event Hall

ION Orchard (pronounced as I-On), formerly known as the Orchard Turn Development or Orchard Turn Site, is a shopping mall in Singapore, next to Orchard MRT station. It is the retail component of an integrated retail and residential development by Orchard Turn Developments Pte Ltd, a joint venture between CapitaLand and Sun Hung Kai Properties. It started operating on 21 July 2009, occupying 335 food and retail outlets. In December 2016, Forbes recognized ION Orchard as one of the top shopping malls in Singapore.

The Orchard Residences, the residential component of the development, is a high-rise residential condominium. It was completed along with the shopping mall under the same developer, manager and owner in 2010. It owns a 99-year leasehold with effect from 13 March 2006.

== History ==
The Orchard Turn Development, now known as The Orchard Residences and ION Orchard after its official names were revealed on 5 February 2007 and 16 July that year respectively, was built on the site of the former park located directly above Orchard. The MRT station's Exit C was closed and demolished on 15 January 2008 to make way for the ION Orchard development. A replacement for the exit, Exit E, was opened on the same day.

ION Orchard has 941,700 square feet (87,490 m^{2}) of gross floor area and 663,000 square feet (61,600 m^{2}) of retail space, which is larger than Ngee Ann City but smaller than Suntec City Mall and VivoCity, the largest shopping mall in Singapore. Designed by RSP Architects Planners & Engineers with Benoy, the Orchard Turn Development has won two EG Retail and Future Project Awards, the Best Architectural Entry and the Best Retail Development over 20,000 m², at Mapic 2006 held in Cannes, France, in November 2006. The construction was completed by Japanese contractor Penta-Ocean Construction Co., Ltd. in 2010.

== Facilities ==
Layered across the walls of ION Orchard, the Media Facade is a multi-sensory canvas media wall.

A 5,600 sq ft (520 m^{2}) art and exhibition gallery is located on the fourth floor of the shopping mall. Called ION Art, it aims to combine art and commerce. An art and design programme is implemented to introduce new and multimedia art into the mall experience, promoting the best of Asian modern and contemporary art and design from established and emerging artists and designers. Under this programme, permanent and changing sculptures and media installations will be located throughout the mall with art exhibitions held throughout the year within the ION Art Gallery and other locations in the mall.

The development's observation deck, ION Sky, is located on the 55th and 56th floor of the building. With a height of 218 m above ground, it offers a panoramic view of the city. It will also have a 75,000 sq ft (7,000 m^{2}) garden on its 9th floor, together with two club facilities on its 9th and 30th floors.

The mall has seven subway entrances that are connected to ION Orchard via Orchard. The first entrance, Exit 5 (formerly as Exit E) (facing Wheelock Place), was opened on the morning of 15 January 2008, the same day when the station's Exit 3 (formerly as Exit C) (facing Wisma Atria) was closed and slated to be demolished and subsequently completed later that year. Mounted on Exit 5's wall were more than 90 metres of LED walls, that can be programmed with different colours and patterns on its light displays to create a certain mood, even for festive occasions. It can also be used for advertising or as an art gallery from time to time.

With the opening of the Thomson–East Coast MRT line, five additional exits were added, exits 6, 8 and 9 which are connected to the Basement 1 floor of the mall, while exits 7 and 10 are located on the street level of the mall. With that, only one retail shop is being built and is leased to Cotton On Body.

The mall has a linkway leading from Orchard MRT Station to Tangs Plaza (which is considered NSL Exit 1). The stretch had undergone a widening project which was completed in November 2014. Besides Rubi Shoes, other shops include Redeye, Metaphor, Owndays, Yankee Candle, VDL Cosmetics, Lovisa, 7-Eleven and LUSH.

These new tenants join ION Orchard's existing collection of fashion favourites such as Victoria's Secret, H&M, and Mango at ION Paterson Link, located at Basement 2 of the mall. However, H&M closed its doors on the 12th March 2023 after it open for a decade and was replaced with Victoria's Sercet.

The mall has a walkway leading from Orchard Boulevard to Orchard MRT station. Called the Orchard Boulevard Entrance, the first LED-lit subway entrance was opened on 10 June 2008 at the MRT station, with the help of the Land Transport Authority and SMRT Corporation on the planning of the walkway. Synchronized with ION Orchard's facade and canopy, the walkway has LED panels to create a surround experience for commuters, and a fritted glass-and-steel canopy roof to allow natural light to filter through. The walkway will also have easy access to the basement and ground levels of the mall from the subway station's concourse level as well as the walkway connecting the subway station to Wheelock Place.

The mall also has a car park with approximately 500 parking spots (including handicap parking), between the fourth and the eighth floors. Over 100 media screens located both inside and outside the shopping mall, including those above restroom urinals, are managed by JCDecaux.

== Tenants ==
With a lettable area of almost 660 000 sq ft, around 400 retail outlets are currently located at ION Orchard. To date, there are various flagship stores, which include Rubi Shoes (which opened on 21 July 2009 and has since expanded island-wide, before being closed on 21 November 2025), New Look, Li Ning, T.M. Lewin, Zara, Harry Winston, Dsquared2 and Bershka.

On 12 November 2013, Rubi Shoes relocated to one store near Orchard MRT Station (Exit 1) to replace Etude House. New Look was replaced by Zalora Flagship, and eventually Bershka. Bershka's old premise is now taken up by Sephora. On 16 June 2020, Topshop was permanently closed down, with the space being absorbed by expanded Uniqlo and the flagship Love Bonito. On 12 June 2022, Bershka officially closed down the ION Orchard outlet, and was replaced by a larger and flagship Cotton On outlet. On 17 August 2023, Cotton On Body was reallocated to one store at Orchard MRT Station (Exit 6) and the space was reallocated to ALDO. On 21 November 2025, Rubi Shoes has officially closed down the last outlet at Orchard MRT Station (Exit 1), the Rubi Shoes brand was officially retired from operation in Singapore.

Due to the ION Orchard's Asset Enhancement Initiative (AEI) from March 2023, there has been some rearrangement of stores. H&M has closed down ION Orchard on 12 March 2023 and the space was split into Superga, Victoria's Secret, Escentials, Diptyque, Lovet, Klarra and Benjamin Barker.

Four multi-label stores and several new-to-market food as well as dining propositions have also been confirmed, along with established food operators. There is a food court present at ION Orchard known as the Food Opera. There used to be a supermarket chain - ThreeSixty, but however it was shut down in May 2011 due to lack of business.

More than 21% of the lettable area has been used for dining purposes, with 60 out of the 125 dining outlets new-to-market or new concepts. There are 28 restaurants and cafes, with the largest cluster at level 4 for fine dining and levels 2 and 3 for casual dining. Dunkin' Donuts also returned to Singapore with an outlet in ION Orchard. A reputable top day spa Estheva Spa was another tenant to move into Ion Orchard.

Singapore Airlines’ City Ticketing Office moved to ION Orchard on 24 July 2009. This is a shift from its original location at The Paragon and the interim location at the Atrium@Orchard from 2007 to July 2009.

In January 2013, Crate & Barrel opened its first Asian store in ION Orchard which was closed down on 19 May 2023. The 16,000 sq ft (1,500 m^{2}) duplex store is located on levels 3 and 4. It was replaced by Proof Living.

== In popular culture ==
- The mall is featured in HBO series Westworld, as part of the third season.
- The mall will be featured in HBO series Euphoria, as part of the third season.

== Gallery ==
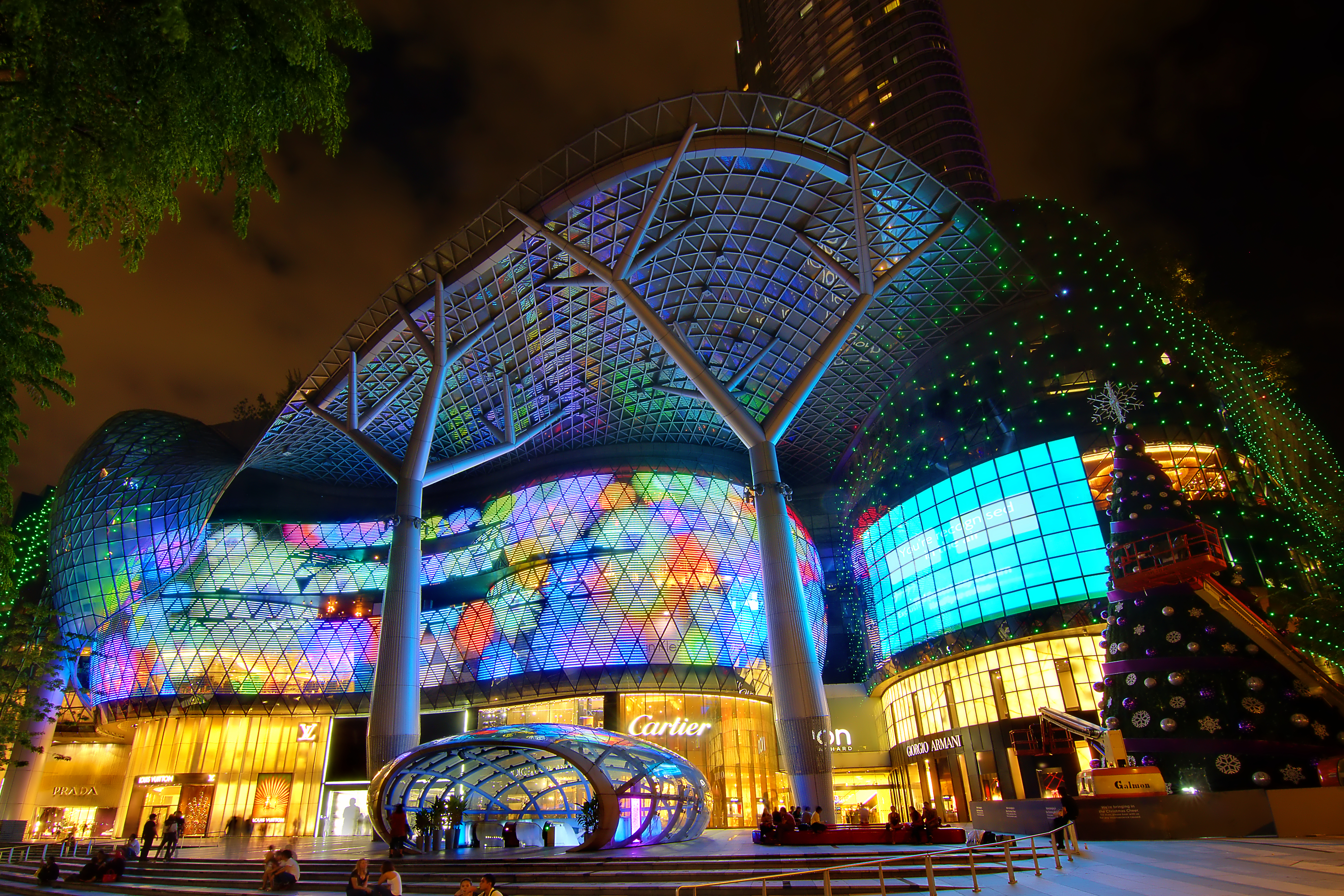
Exterior at Orchard and Paterson Roads

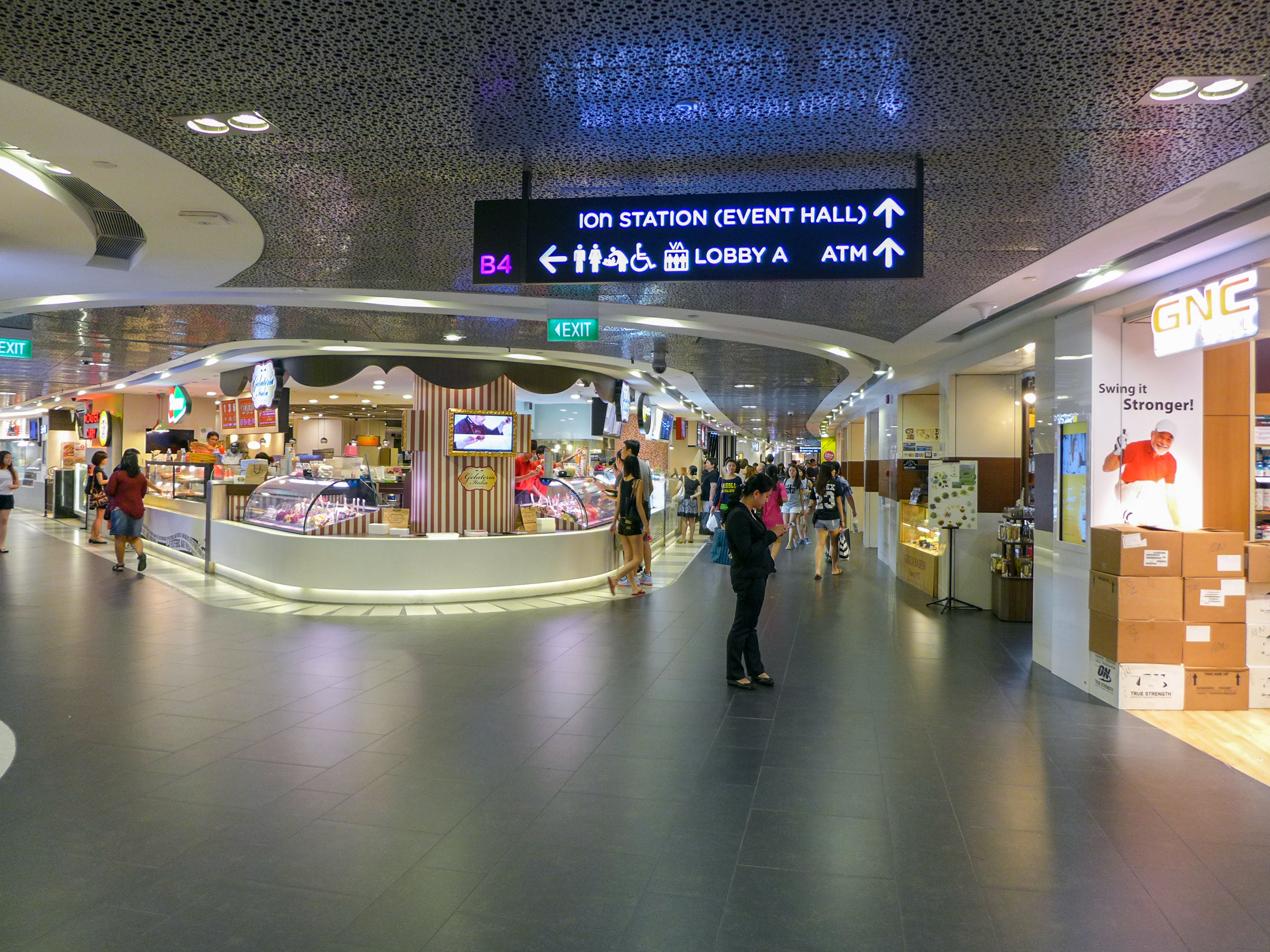
B4 ION Food Hall

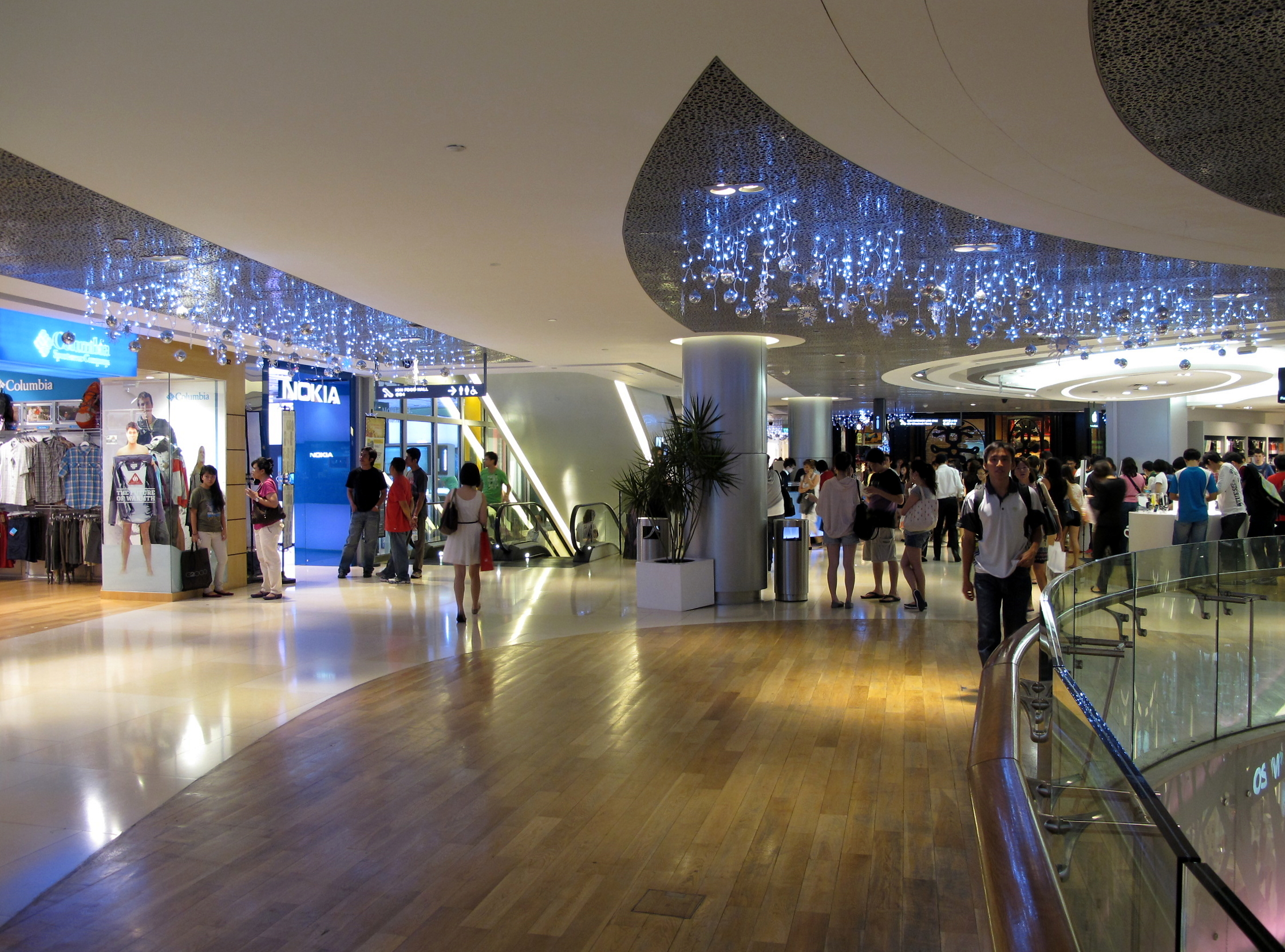
B3 shops

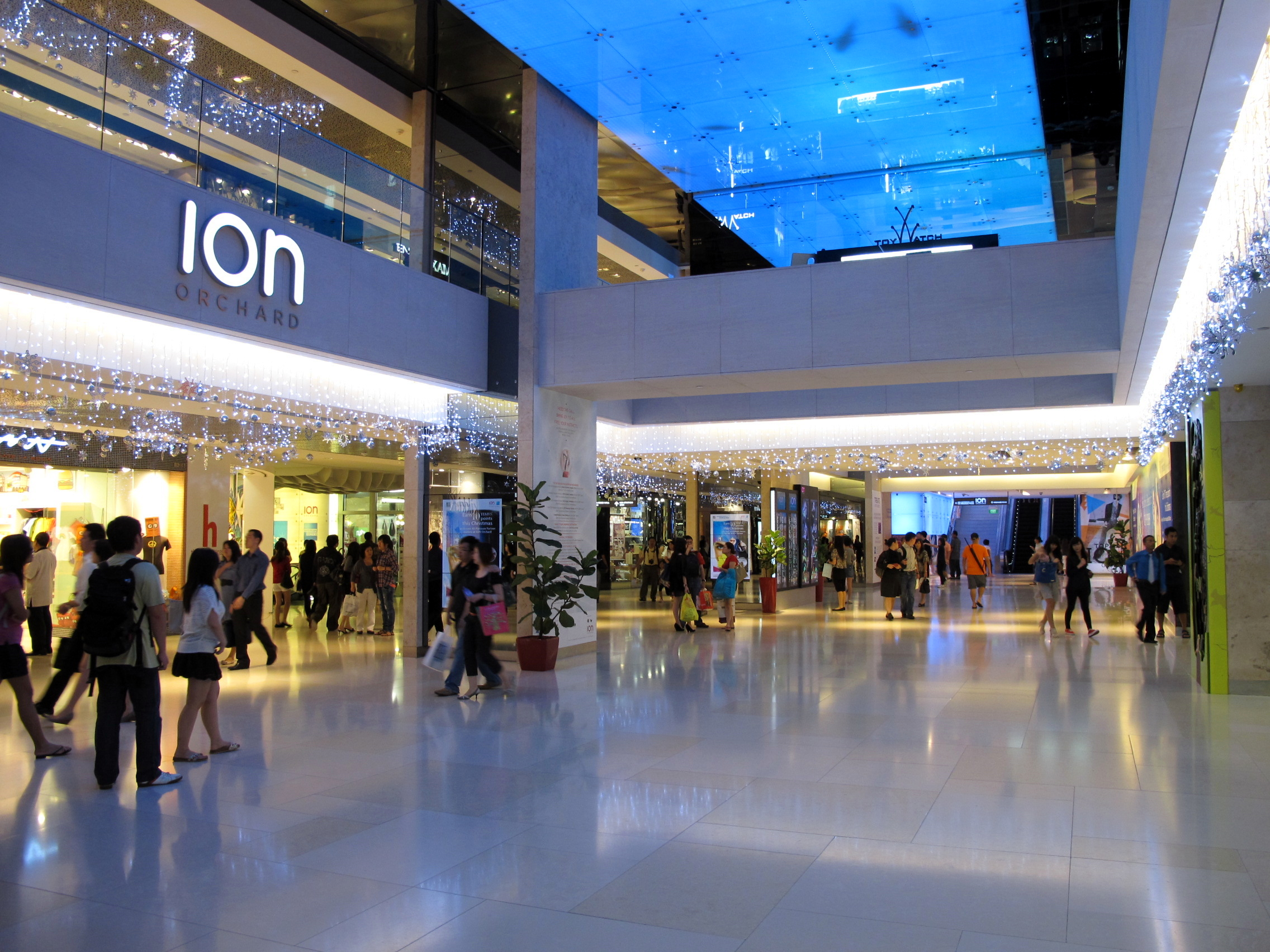
B2 MRT Entrance

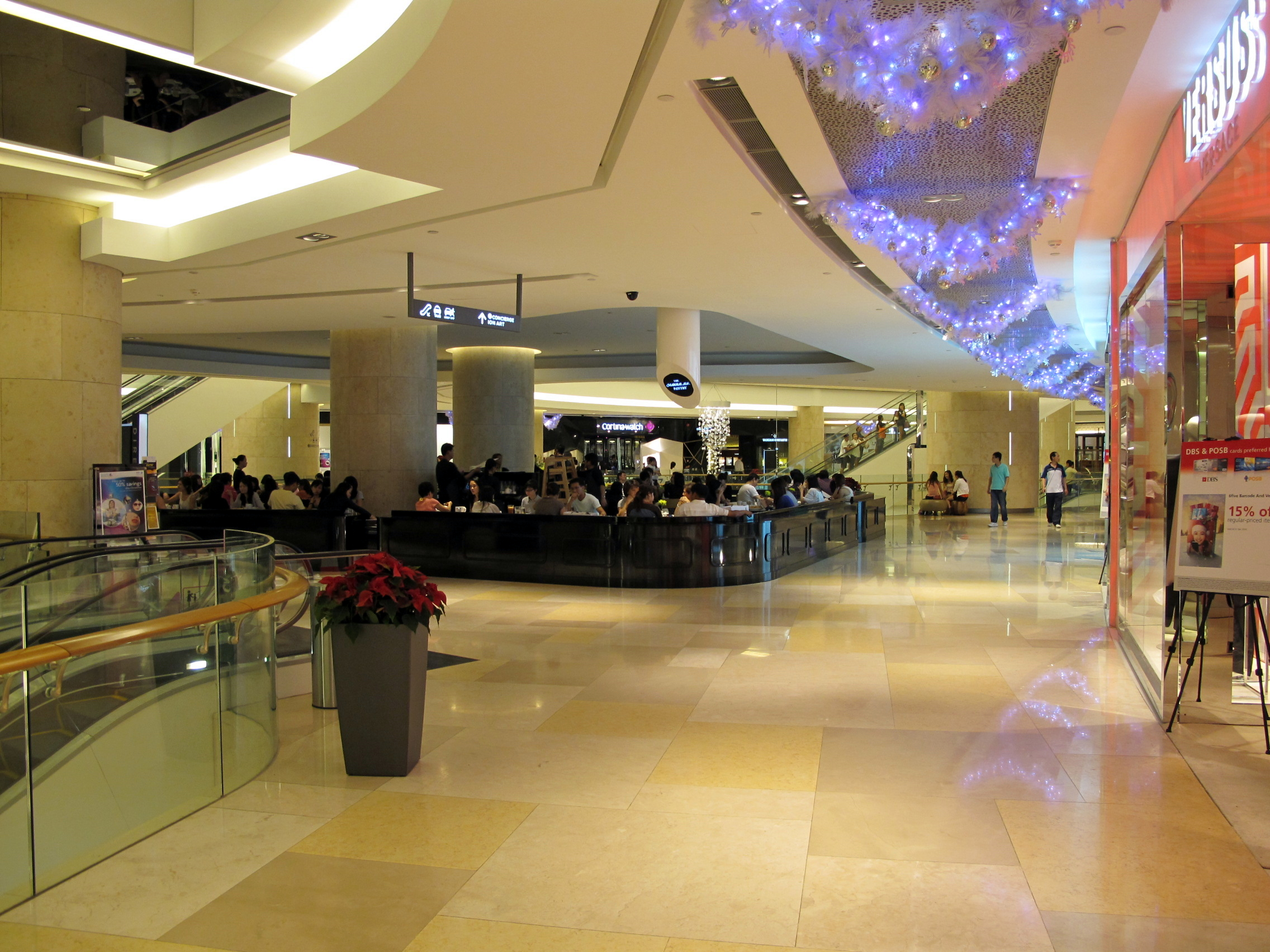
Level 3 shops

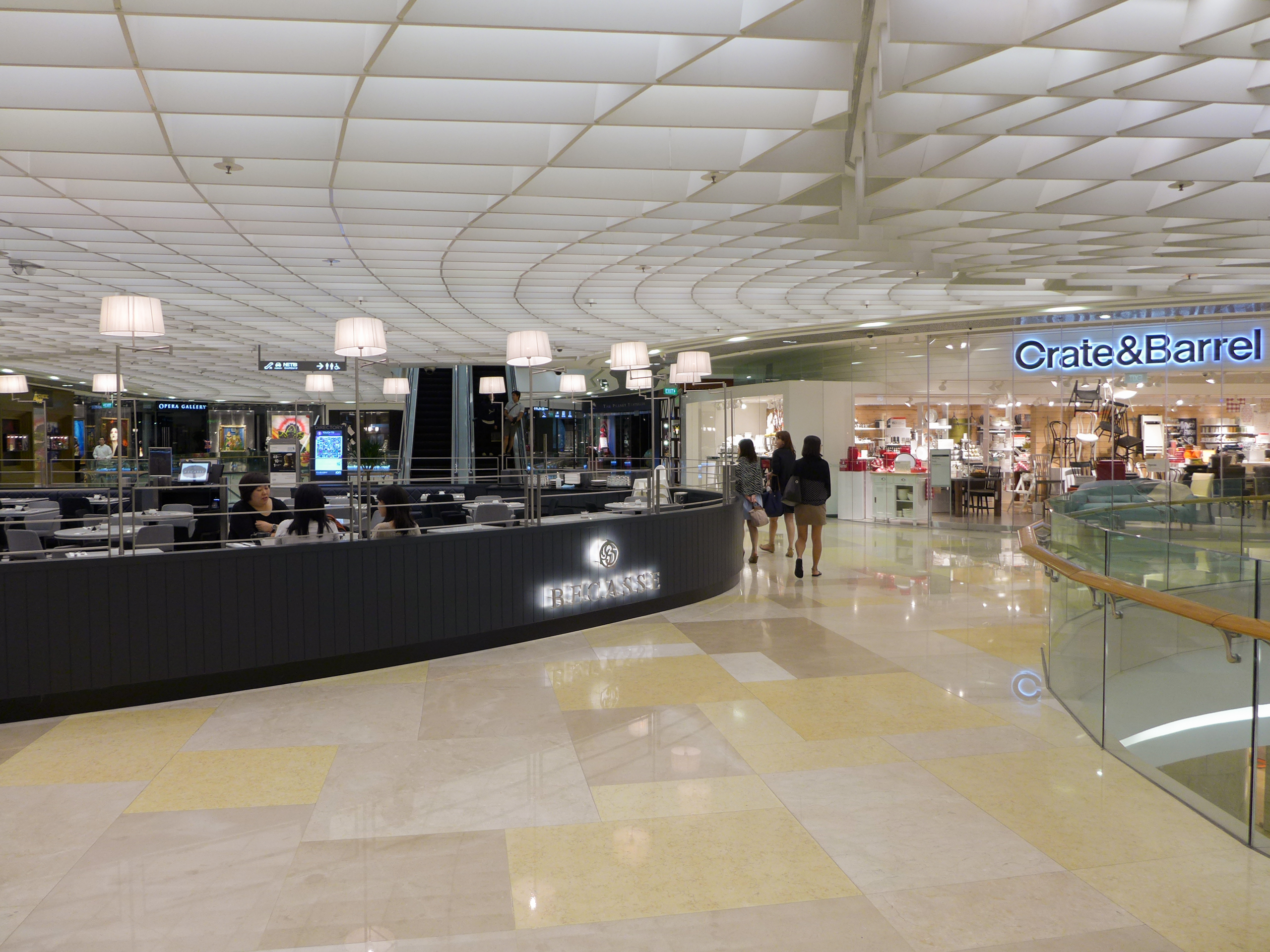
Level 4 shops

== See also ==
- Orchard Road
