= Paragon, Singapore =

Paragon
- Paragon Facade in 2010
- Location: Singapore
- Coordinates: 1°18′13.72″N 103°50′07.70″E
- Address: 290 Orchard Road
- Opened: 1986
- Developer: Paragon Properties
- Manager: SPH Retail Property Management Services
- Owner: Orchard 290 Ltd
- Num. of stores: 196
- Num. of anchor tenants: 4
- Floor area: 483,000 square feet (44,900 m^{2}) (retail); 222,000 square feet (20,600 m^{2}) (tower)
- Floors: 6 (retail); 14 (medical)
- Public transit: NS23 Somerset; NS22 TE14 Orchard
- Website: paragon.com.sg

The Paragon is a luxury shopping complex located at the corner of Bideford and Orchard roads, in the Orchard Road planning area of Singapore.

== History ==
In May 1982, Paragon Properties, a family company of Lee Eu Seng, announced to build a $100 million shopping complex, Paragon on the former site of Orchard, a shopping complex, in Orchard Road. It was planned to finish building by early 1984 with a residential block to be built later. The building was designed by local architecture firm Kumpulan Akitek and constructed by Japanese construction firm Nakano Corporation.

The construction of the shopping complex was stopped in 1983 due to a change of design of the building and pending approval of the Building Control Division (BCD).

In April 1984, BCD had approved the concept plan and still reviewing the building plans. Mitsubishi Corporation won a $45 million contract to build the podium block of Paragon while the building of a 18-storey tower block comprising 23 residential units was postponed. The redesign was also done by Kumpulan Akitek.

In 1986, Paragon completed construction along with an overhead walkway link to the Promenade Shopping Centre, next to it. The owner offered low rental rates, 50 per cent lower than 1982 rates, to attract tenants. Paragon opened in December.

In 1987, Metro became Paragon's anchor tenant and would occupy the third and fourth storeys of the building. It opened in December in the same year.

In 1988, Paragon Properties was looking for a buyer for Paragon. In August, United Industrial Corporation (UIC) bought Paragon for $280 million. While purchasing the building, UIC had also declared its intention to sell the building for a right price. In less than a year, in September 1989, UIC sold Paragon and an adjoining site to Sogo for $690 million.

In 1996, Singapore Press Holdings with partners acquired Paragon by Sogo and the Promenade Shopping Centre buildings.

It was redeveloped in the late 1990s, transforming it into a modern glass-covered building. It has been described as “posh and sleek”.

In January 2008, Paragon was embarked on an $82 million facelift which included a $37 million land premium to expand its commercial space on the nearby space which was once a former site of The Promenade as its new wing, which saw the addition of three more floors of office and medical space as well as new retails stores.

Led by the architecture firm DP Architects, the makeover was completed in December 2008. Paragon emerged with a contemporary facade.

The renovation was also in step with the URA's call to building owners to create more interesting and unique building facades to enhance the vibrancy of Orchard Road. In January 2017, Forbes recognized Paragon as one of the top five shopping malls in Singapore.

== Stores ==
Paragon is known for its cluster of flagship stores of international high fashion labels such as Tod's, Prada, Miu Miu, Jimmy Choo, Anteprima, Dunhill, Etro, Ermenegildo Zegna and Burberry. Gucci opened its flagship store with five storeys of shopfront presence on the facade in February 2010. Complementing fashion are accessories that include watches, pens and jewellery retailers such as Hublot, Cortina Watch, Larry Jewelry and Loang and Noi, among others, as well as crystal specialist Liuligongfang and handcrafted porcelain Lladró.

Paragon's tenants include Metro departmental store, Toys "R" Us, Marks & Spencer and CS Fresh Gold.

There are several restaurants in the shopping centre, ranging from the moderately priced Thai Express to high-end Imperial Treasure Super Peking Duck Restaurant, as well as the one-Michelin-starred Crystal Jade Golden Palace.

== Paragon Medical ==
Paragon also houses a 20-storey medical and office tower atop the Paragon shopping podium.

== Location and accessibility ==
Paragon is located in Orchard Road between the Somerset and Orchard MRT stations.
