= SAA Architecture =

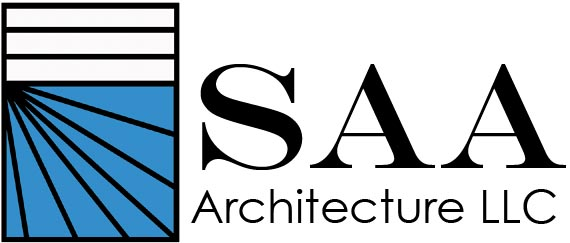
SAA Architecture Logo

SAA Architecture, LLC is an architectural firm founded in 1976 that specializes in the design of facilities for commercial use, as well as space planning design. Commercial, manufacturing, distribution, bio-lab, office, faith-based and retail space facilities are among the types of buildings designed by the firm. SAA Architecture is active in the Mid-Atlantic area of the United States.

== Founder ==
R. Glen Stephens established SAA Architecture. Stephens earned his Bachelor of Architecture Degree from the University of Maryland, a five-year senior architecture program, and was a member of the first graduating class of the school of Architecture. He is an active member of the Tilt-up Concrete construction industry, which combines reasonable cost with low maintenance, durability, speed of construction, and minimal capital investment.

Stephens is a Registered Architect in the states of Maryland, Virginia, Pennsylvania, Delaware, North Carolina, South Carolina, Montana, Texas and the District of Columbia. Stephens also holds a NCARB certification. In addition, Stephens is LEED, AP certified by the Green Building Certification Institute (GBCI), as well as a member of the American Institute of Architects (AIA).

In 2005, the Governor selected Stephens to be a member to the Maryland State Board of Architects. Stephens has served on the board of directors of the Tilt-up Concrete Association (TCA) since 2000. SAA has been an active supporter of the TCA since its creation and has the distinction of being considered charter members. Stephens’ selection marks the first time an Architect has been elected to this Board, and he served as President of the TCA Board in 2003. He has been involved with several key programs and projects for the TCA, which include The Architecture of Tilt-Up, now in its 2nd edition, the globally expanded TCA Achievement Awards, and a Design Charette forum for architects. SAA has supported Tilt-up construction on the east coast since 1980.

Stephens has designed more than 20,000,000 square feet (1,900,000 m^{2}) of commercial, manufacturing, distribution, bio-lab, and office and retail space in the Mid Atlantic area of the United States to date. Stephens has developed and designed twelve R&D, retail, office and distribution facilities that he has participated in as a partner.

Stephens has written articles in Business Monthly about when and how to choose the right architect and projects involving design build methods. In addition, several of Stephens’ projects have been featured in industry publications such as Design Cost Data Magazine.

== Awards ==
SAA Architecture has won the following awards: National Design Award of Achievement, NAIOP Award of Excellence, Best Speculative Building Office Condominium Award of Merit and the 2011 TCA Irving Gill Achievement Award

== Associations ==
SAA Architecture has been a member of Maryland Ready Mix Concrete Association, Inc. (MRMCA) since 2001.
