= Orchard MRT station =

Mass Rapid Transit station in Singapore

Orchard NS22 TE14 乌节 ஆர்ச்சர்ட்
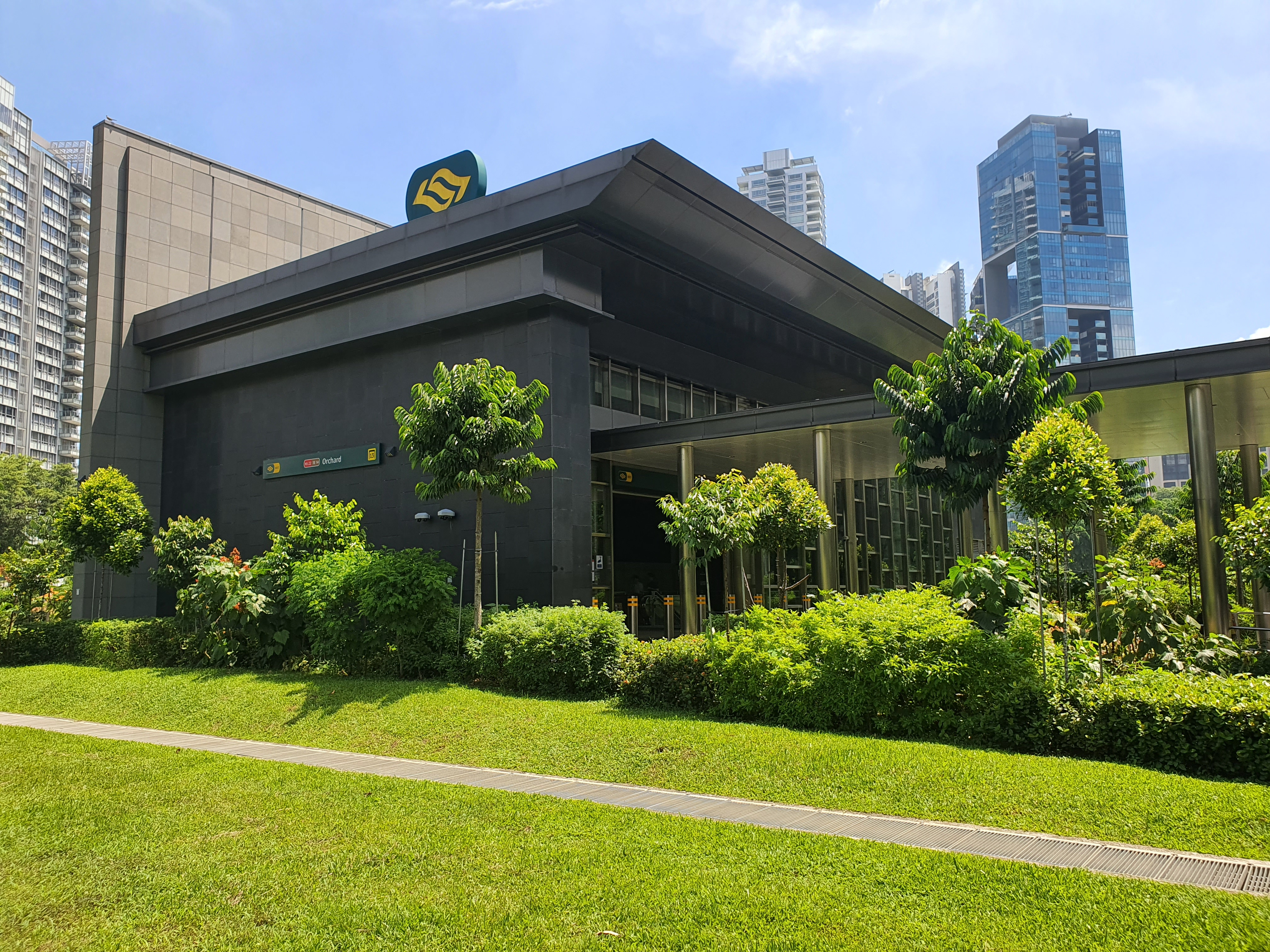
- Exit 13 of Orchard station

General information
- Location: 437 Orchard Road, Singapore 238878 (NSL); 301 Orchard Boulevard, Singapore 237974 (TEL)
- Coordinates: 01°18′11″N 103°49′53″E
- System: Mass Rapid Transit (MRT) interchange
- Owner: Land Transport Authority
- Operator: SMRT Trains
- Line: North–South Line Thomson–East Coast Line
- Platforms: 4 (2 island platforms)
- Tracks: 5 (including a track siding for the northbound TEL platform)
- Connections: Bus, Taxi

Construction
- Structure type: Underground
- Platform levels: 1
- Parking: Yes (Ngee Ann City, Wisma Atria, Tangs, ION Orchard)
- Accessible: Yes

History
- Opened: 12 December 1987; 38 years ago (North–South Line); 13 November 2022; 3 years ago (Thomson–East Coast Line)
- Former names: Scotts, Orchard Boulevard

Passengers
- June 2024: 59,165 per day

Services
Preceding station	Mass Rapid Transit	Following station
Newton towards Jurong East	North–South Line	Somerset towards Marina South Pier
Orchard Boulevard towards Woodlands North	Thomson–East Coast Line	Great World towards Bayshore
Track layout
Location
- Location within Singapore Rail central area

Orchard MRT station is an underground Mass Rapid Transit (MRT) interchange station in Singapore, on the North–South (NSL) and Thomson–East Coast (TEL) lines. Situated along Orchard Boulevard and underneath ION Orchard, the station serves various commercial and retail developments of the Orchard Road shopping district, including Liat Towers, Ngee Ann City, Wheelock Place, Wisma Atria and Shaw House, among others.

Initially announced as Scotts, it was renamed Orchard Boulevard and subsequently Orchard. The station was included in the early plans for the original MRT network in 1982, and opened as part of the NSL extension to Outram Park station on 12 December 1987. In August 2012, it was announced that Orchard station would serve as an interchange with the TEL. Initially expected to be completed in 2021, the TEL platforms opened on 13 November 2022 as part of TEL Stage 3 (TEL3).

The design of Orchard station was intended as a showpiece of the initial MRT network, incorporating a circular concourse with a radial granite floor design. The TEL platforms feature an overhead series of stainless steel panels that reflects the movements of commuters. As part of the MRT network's Art-in-Transit programme, the station features Scotts Road / Orchard Road from ION Sky by Mintio.

== Etymology ==
The station is named after Orchard Road, which is itself named after the fruit orchards and plantations that used to be found in the area. The official written Chinese name for the station (Chinese: 乌节; Pe̍h-ōe-jī: O͘-chiat) is directly inherited from the historical Singaporean Hokkien transliteration of the region's English name.

== History ==
=== North–South Line ===
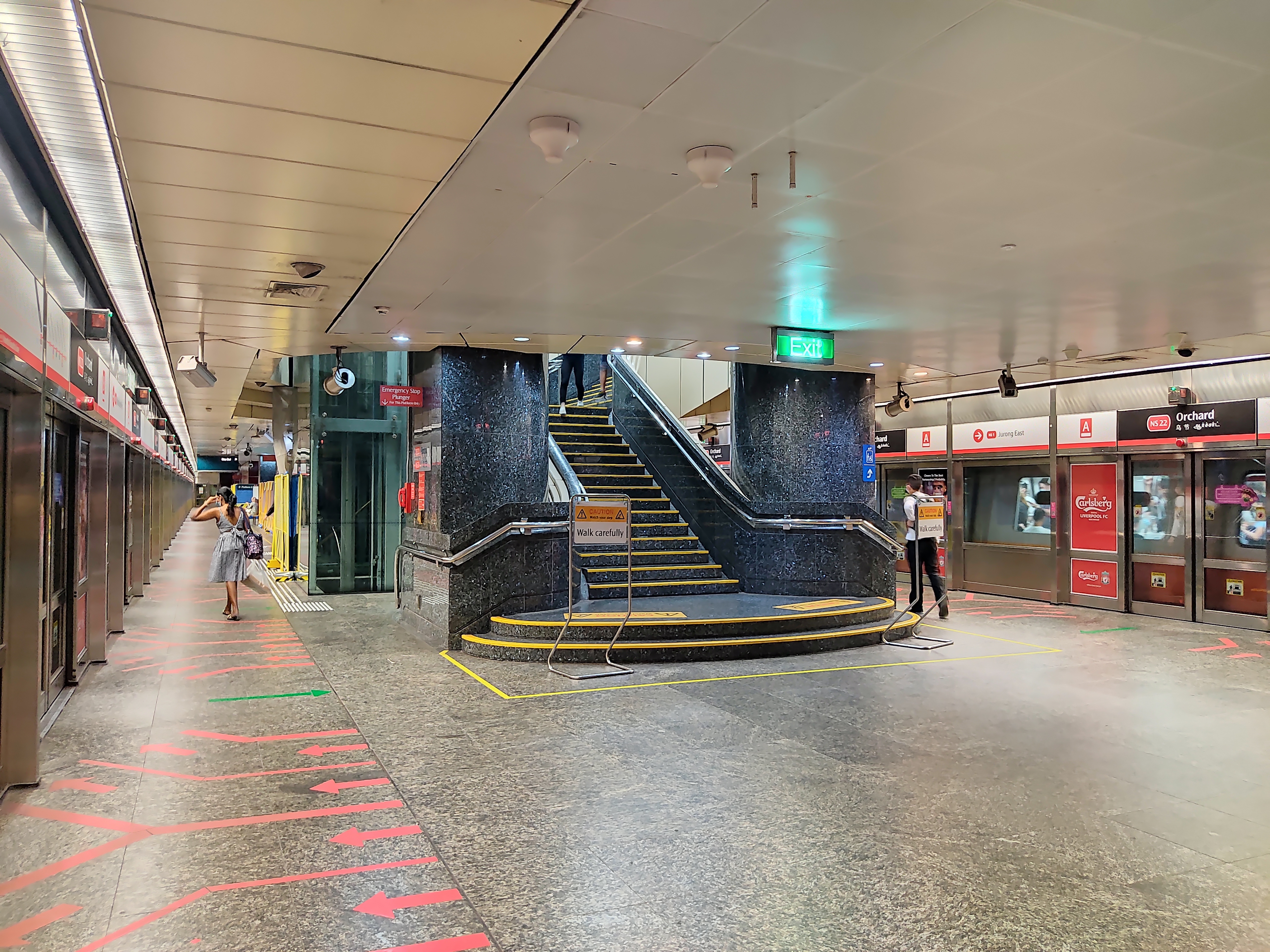
Orchard NSL platforms

What was then known as Scotts station was devised as part of the earliest plans for the MRT network in May 1982. Scotts was renamed Orchard Boulevard in November that year, before the station name was finalised as Orchard station in September 1984. Orchard station was to be constructed as part of the Phase I MRT segment from the Novena to Outram Park stations, which was scheduled to be completed by December 1987. Phase I was given priority as it passed through areas that had a higher demand for public transport, such as the densely populated housing estates of Toa Payoh and Ang Mo Kio and the Central Area. The line aimed to relieve the traffic congestion on the Thomson–Sembawang road corridor.

The contract for the construction of Orchard station and 2 kilometres (1.2 miles) of tunnels from Newton to Somerset stations was awarded to a joint venture between Borie SAE and Ong Chwee Kou Building Contractors Limited for S$78.8 million (US$109.2 million in 2022) in October 1983. The station was to be constructed on the site of the former Orchard Road police station. On 10 May 1984, Orchard Turn, a slip road connecting Orchard Boulevard to Orchard Road, was realigned to facilitate MRT construction works.

Train services commenced on 12 December 1987 when the MRT extension to Outram Park station was completed. The station was part of a route that ran continuously from Yishun station in the north to Lakeside station in the west. On 28 October 1989, it began serving the North–South Line (NSL) when MRT operations were split. (Note: The MRT system was split into EWL (running from Tanah Merah station to Lakeside) and the NSL (running from Yishun station to Marina Bay).) A linkway to the Tangs department store opened on 18 June 1991, following a delay due to a dispute between developers of Tangs and the Public Works Department. British Prime Minister Margaret Thatcher visited Orchard station on 31 July 1988 as part of her official trip to Singapore.

=== Thomson–East Coast Line ===
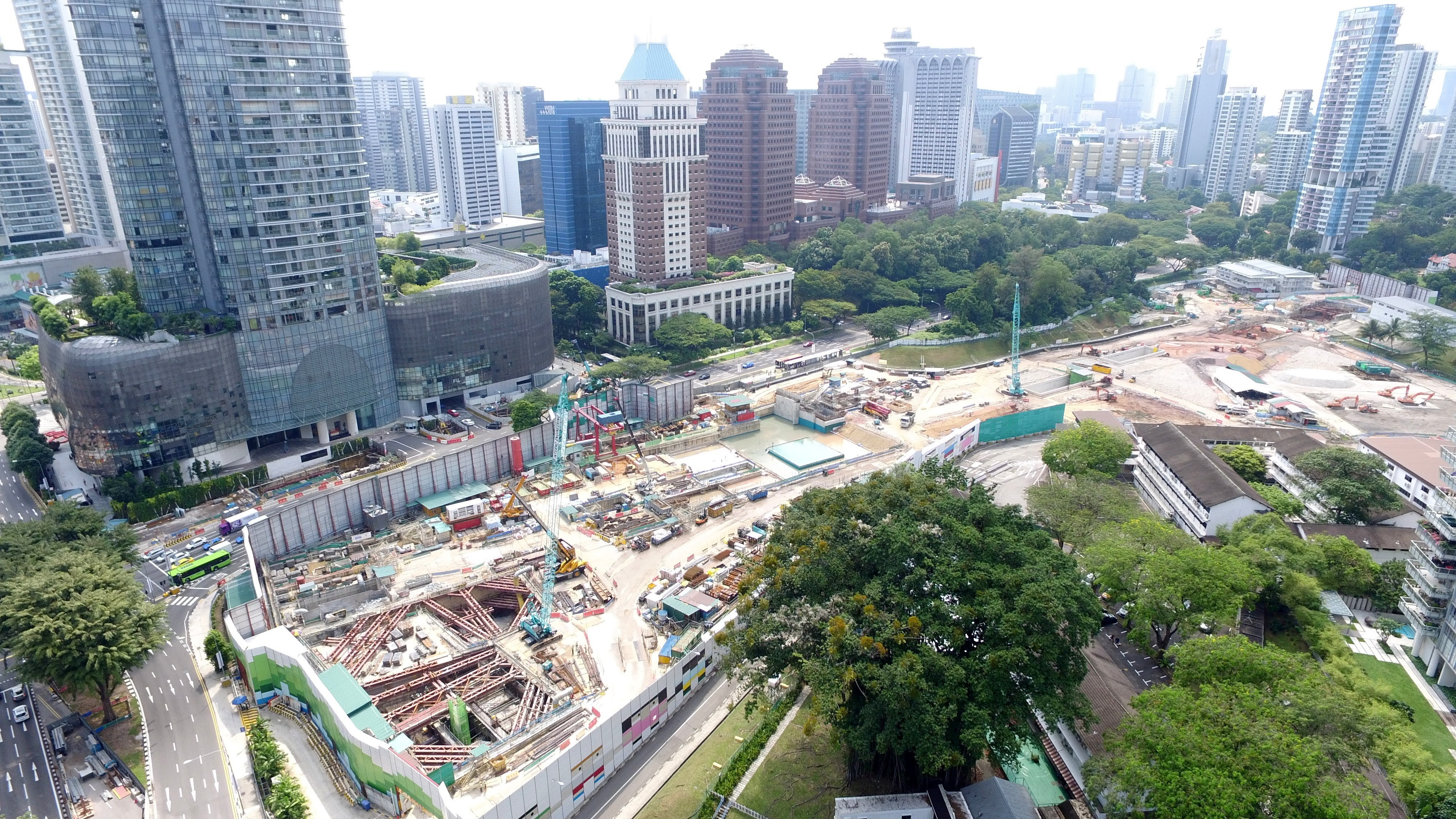
Construction site of the TEL station in April 2021

Orchard station was announced as an interchange station with the planned 22-station Thomson line (TSL) on 29 August 2012. The contract for the design and construction of the TEL and associated tunnels was awarded to a joint venture between Penta-Ocean Construction Co Ltd and Bachy Soletanche Singapore Pte Ltd for S$498 million (US$371.6 million) in July 2014. Construction started in 2014, with a completion date initially set for 2021.

On 15 August 2014, the Land Transport Authority (LTA) announced that the TSL would merge with the Eastern Region line to form the Thomson–East Coast Line (TEL). Orchard station was set to be constructed as part of TEL 3, which consisted of 13 stations between Mount Pleasant and Gardens by the Bay. With restrictions imposed on the delivery of material and manpower for the station's construction due to the COVID-19 pandemic, the TEL3 completion date was delayed by one year to 2022.

The pipe-roofing method was used to construct the linkway between the TEL and NSL platforms. Installing the interlocking steel pipes to form a box tunnel required the first use of a retractable micro-tunnel boring machine in Singapore. This method was used to minimise impacts on traffic and on building structures above ground. The new box structure underneath the existing NSL station was constructed via the mining and underpinning method, employing specialised equipment that could drill in limited spaces and all directions. The LTA had to coordinate with station operator SMRT to minimise disruptions to NSL operations, with mining works carried out strictly according to approved designs and methods.

On 9 March 2022, S. Iswaran, Transport Minister, announced in Parliament that TEL 3 would open in the second half of that year. As confirmed during a visit by Iswaran at the Outram Park and Maxwell stations on 7 October 2022, the TEL platforms began operations on 13 November.

== Details ==
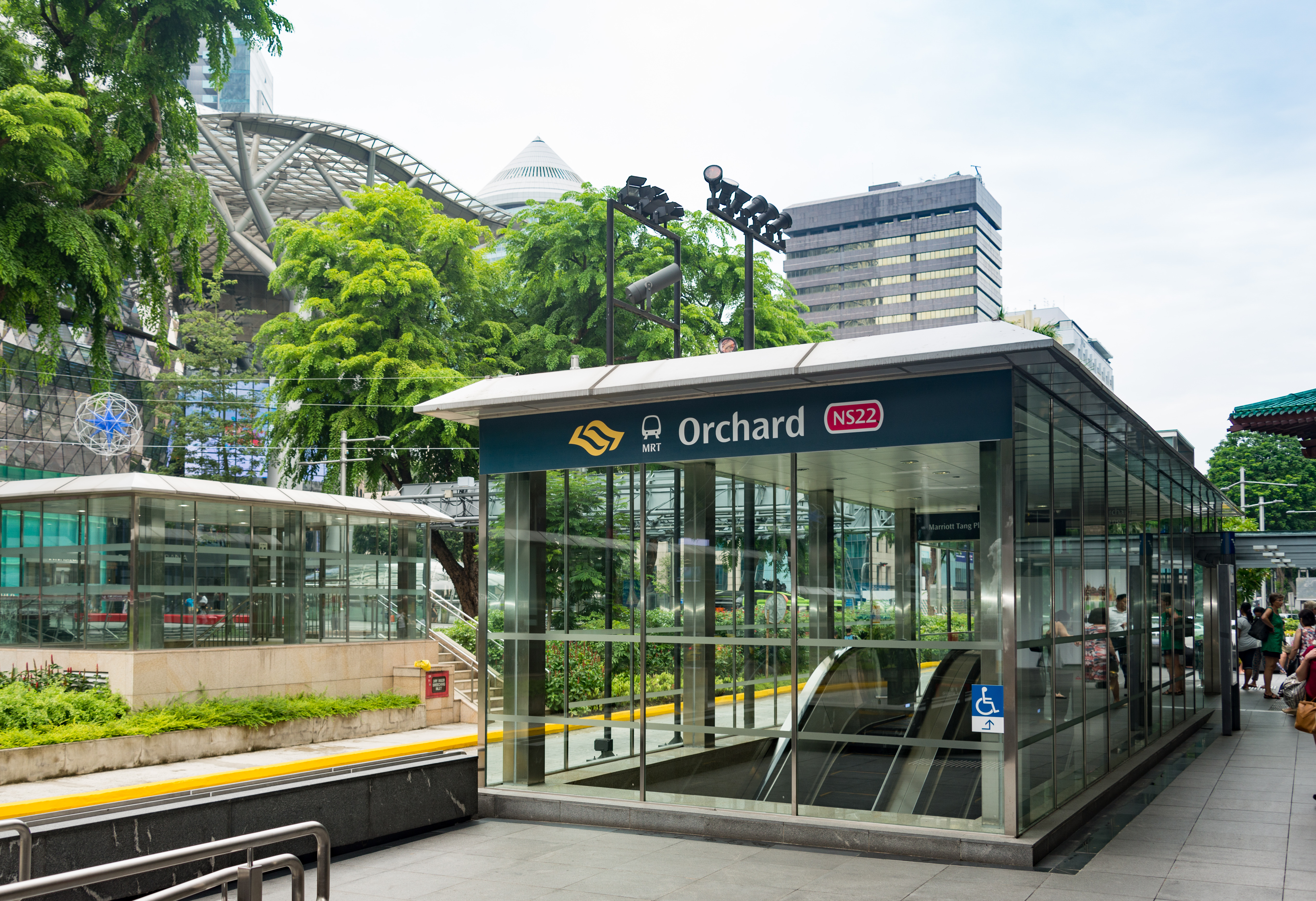
An entrance into Orchard MRT station (NS22/TE14) adjacent to Tangs

Orchard station is an interchange station on the NSL and TEL; the official station codes are NS22 (formerly N3) and TE14. On the NSL, the station is between Newton and Somerset stations, while on the TEL, it is between Orchard Boulevard and Great World stations. Trains on the NSL run every 2 to 5 minutes, while trains on the TEL run approximately every 3 to 6 minutes. Being part of the NSL and TEL, the station is operated by SMRT Trains.

Located along Orchard Boulevard, the station has thirteen entrances that serve various retail and commercial developments in the Orchard area. The station serves surrounding shopping centres including Far East Plaza, ION Orchard, Liat Towers, Lucky Plaza, Shaw House, Tang Plaza, Wisma Atria, Wheelock Place and Ngee Ann City, along with other landmarks such as Mount Elizabeth Hospital and the Royal Thai Embassy.

== Architecture ==
=== North–South Line ===
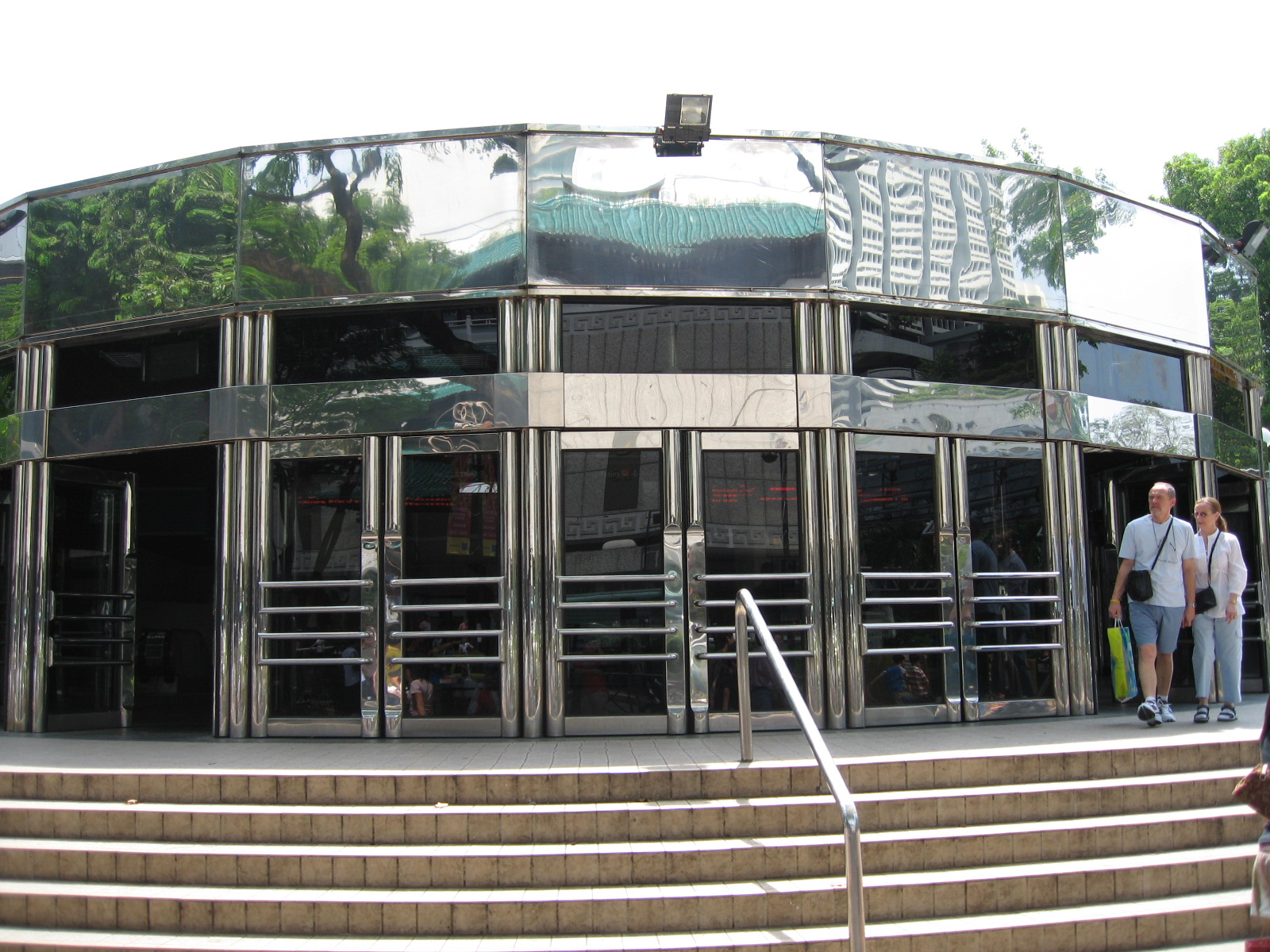
A former entrance to the station that existed from 1987 until 2006, later demolished for the ION Orchard shopping mall

The station incorporates a general colour scheme of pink, red and grey. Intended to be the "showpiece" of the MRT system, the Orchard NSL station adopted a "bold" design, since it was to be the focal point of the tourist belt. As such, symmetrical and circular motifs were incorporated into the design, which included a dome over the station's circular concourse—the heart of the station's design. Supported by cylindrical columns, the dome was 11.5 metres (38 ft) in diameter with a height of 5.5 metres (18 ft), consisting of 160 triangular panels in grey. However, the dome was removed on 15 January 2008 with the ION Orchard development. The concourse has a radial granite floor design in specially-cut concentric pattern produced with the juxtaposition of two varieties of granite.

Two elliptical voids provide access from the concourse to the platforms. Like many stations on the initial MRT network, the NSL station has an island platform. Due to space constraints resulting in a smaller station box, the mechanical rooms are located within the public area of the platforms.

=== Thomson–East Coast Line ===
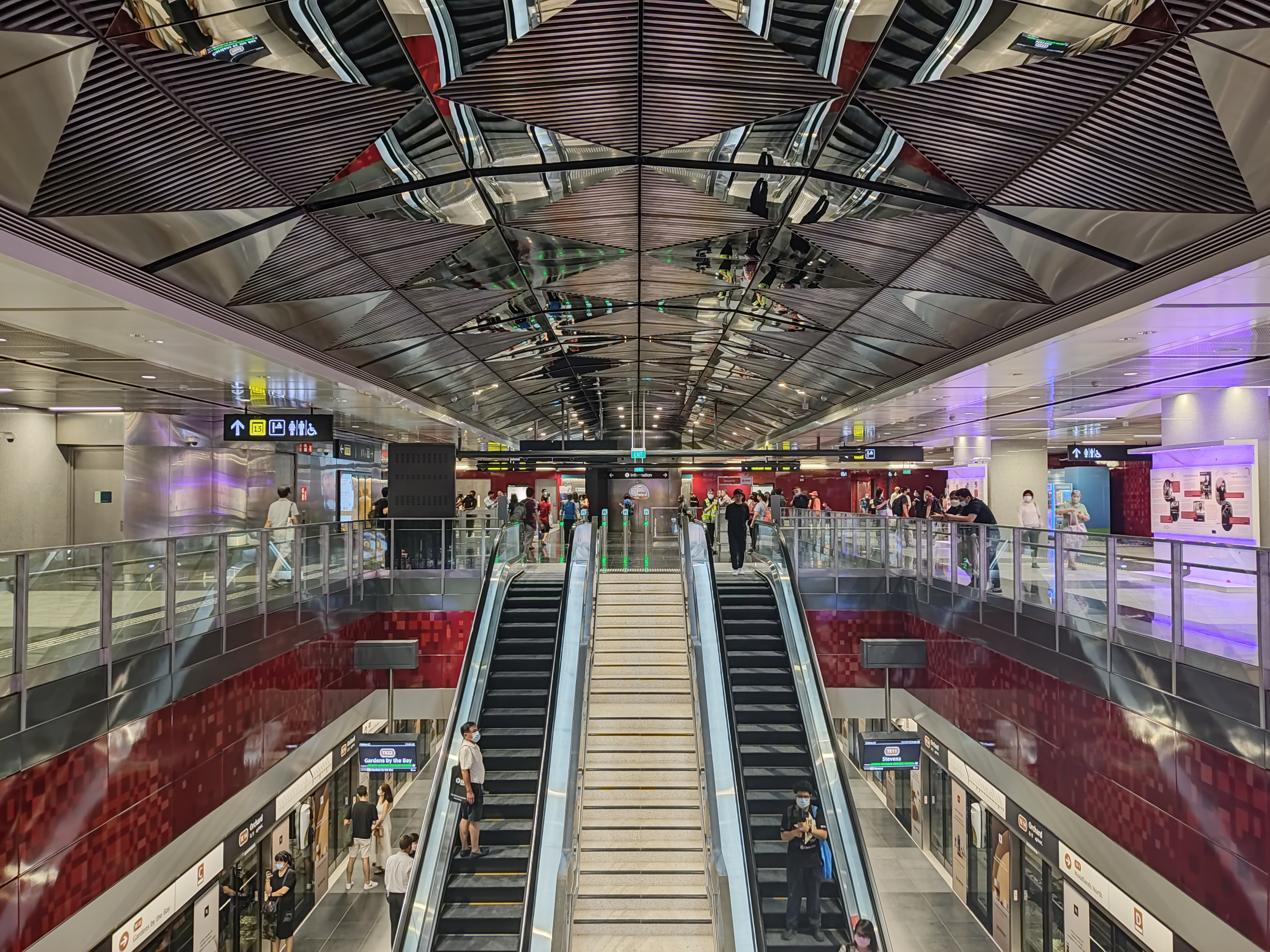
Concourse level of Orchard TEL station

Designed by SAA Architecture, the TEL station was intended to remain a distinctive transport hub in the Orchard shopping district while being integrated with the existing NSL station and surrounding developments. To improve wayfinding, the walls of the linkway to the NSL station were adorned in red and white pixelated prints, with the station platform and concourse in various shades of red. The stainless steel panels on the station ceiling reflect the constant movement of commuters, symbolising the vibrancy of the Orchard area. To blend into natural surroundings and minimise the impact on heritage trees, the five additional entrances of the TEL station were built into slopes and kept at a low height. The TEL station was constructed at a depth of 30 metres (98 ft).

Scotts Road and Orchard Road from ION Sky by Mintio are displayed at this station as part of the Art-in-Transit programme—a showcase of public artworks on the MRT network. Scotts Road is a panoramic photo captured from ground level depicting the street. Displayed across the concourse level, the photo is created using a single roll of film with multiple exposures, providing commuters a glimpse of the vibrant shopping district. Another piece featured in the station, Orchard Road from ION Sky, depicts the abstraction of night lights taken from the highest point of Orchard Road (ION Sky).
