= Wisma Atria =

Coordinates: 1°18′13″N 103°49′59.6″E

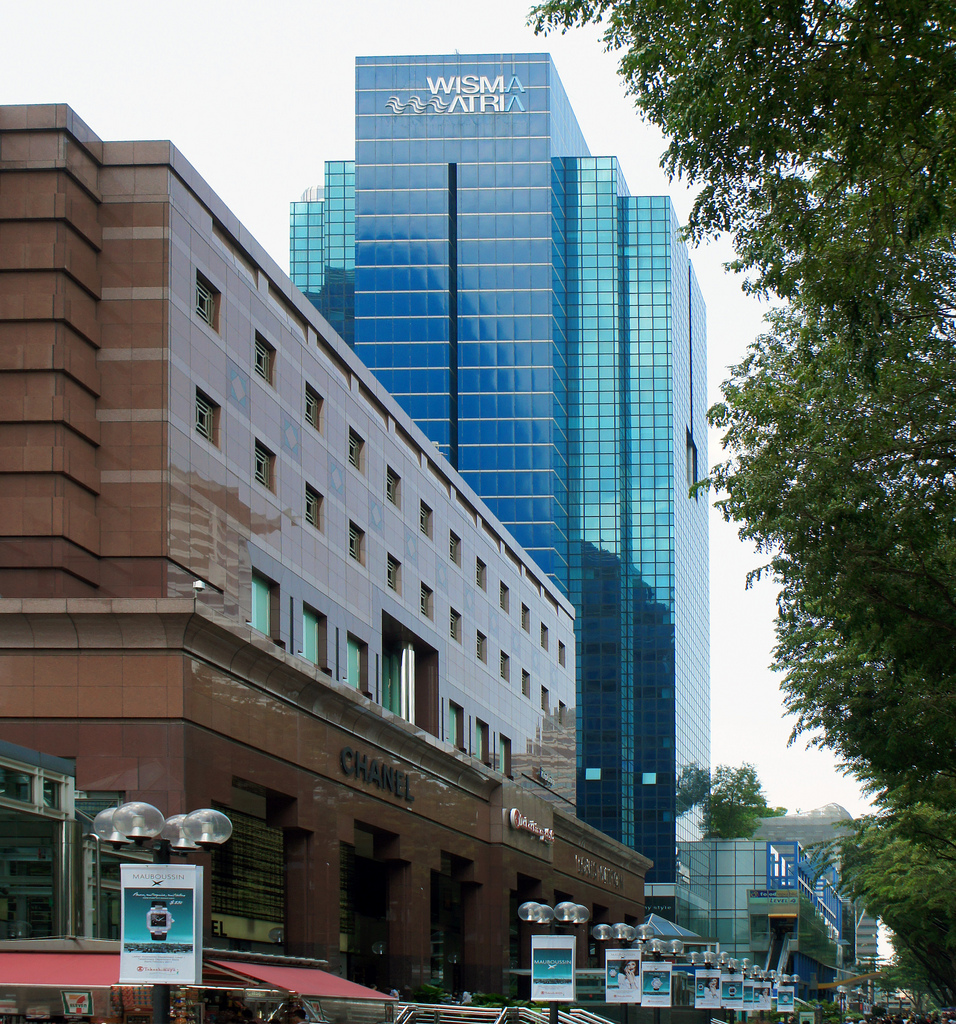
- Wisma Atria building
- Address: 435 Orchard Road, Singapore 238877
- Opened: 13 November 1986; 39 years ago
- Manager: YTL Starhill Global Property Management
- Owner: YTL Starhill Global Property Management
- Num. of stores: 100
- Num. of anchor tenants: 4
- Floor area: 230,000 square feet (21,000 m^{2})
- Floors: B, L1-L4 (Retail) L5-L7(Parking) L10-L22 (Office)
- Parking: 370
- Public transit: NS22 TE14 Orchard
- Website: Wisma Atria

Wisma Atria is a shopping mall on Orchard Road in Singapore. The 230,000 square feet (21,000 m^{2}) centre, which opened on 13 November 1986, is directly linked underground to Orchard MRT station and neighbouring centres.

Prior to the construction of Wisma Atria, Wisma Indonesia occupied the land, though was demolished in 1983 to make way for the mall, then called The Wisma. The mall was renamed to Wisma Atria in 1985 following Dubai Bank Ltd's acquisition of its developer, A. W. Galadari Pte Ltd. The mall underwent renovations in 2004, resulting in its clear glass façade. Wisma Atria also underwent renovations in the 2010s.

Wisma Atria features five floors dedicated to shopping, including one basement level and four above-ground retail levels, along with three levels of parking space. It also hosts over 100 stores.

== Location ==
Wisma Atria is at the intersection between Orchard Road and Scotts Road. It is next to Orchard MRT station.

== History ==
Prior to Wisma Atria, Wisma Indonesia, completed, occupied its site. In November 1977, rumours surfaced that Wisma Indonesia was to be replaced by a skyscraper, though it was denied by the Indonesian Embassy, the main tenets of the building. Wisma Indonesia was put up for sale by the embassy in March 1981 and was in a negotiation deal in the same month.

Wisma Indonesia was demolished in 1983 and a shopping mall, The Wisma, was built over the site. The developer of the mall was Wisma Development Pte Ltd, a subsidiary of A. W. Galadari Pte Ltd, a Dubai company owned by the Galadari brothers.

In 1984, after Abdul Wahab Galadari's assets were seized by the United Arab Emirates's government over the Union Bank of the Middle East's dealings, one of many Galadari's companies, A. W. Galadari Pte Ltd was taken over by Dubai Bank Ltd, a bank owned by A. W. Galadari's brothers. In 1985, the mall was renamed to Wisma Atria after the Union Bank of the Middle East took over Dubai Bank Ltd.

Wisma Atria underwent renovations in 2004 by local architect cum designers DP Architects. Notable changes include the replacement of the original blue facade with clear glass, a new Grand Entrance facing Orchard Road on Level 2, new large Wisma Atria signage on a new blue grid structure facing Orchard Road and external lighted escalators on the facade leading to Levels 3 and 4.

In the 2010s, Wisma Atria undergone renovations and it was completed in third quarter of 2012.

== Gallery ==
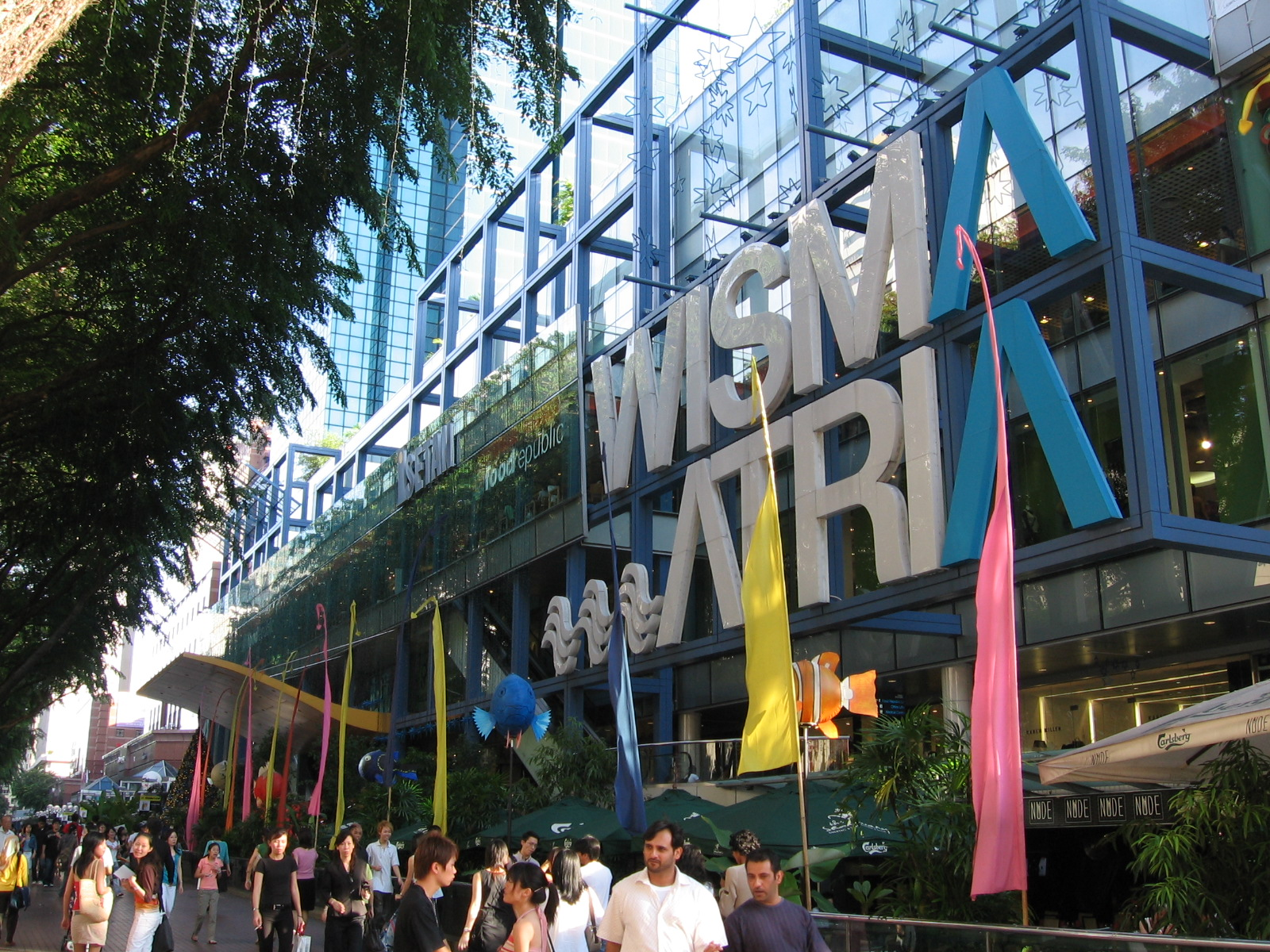
Wisma Atria's distinct contemporary glass facade

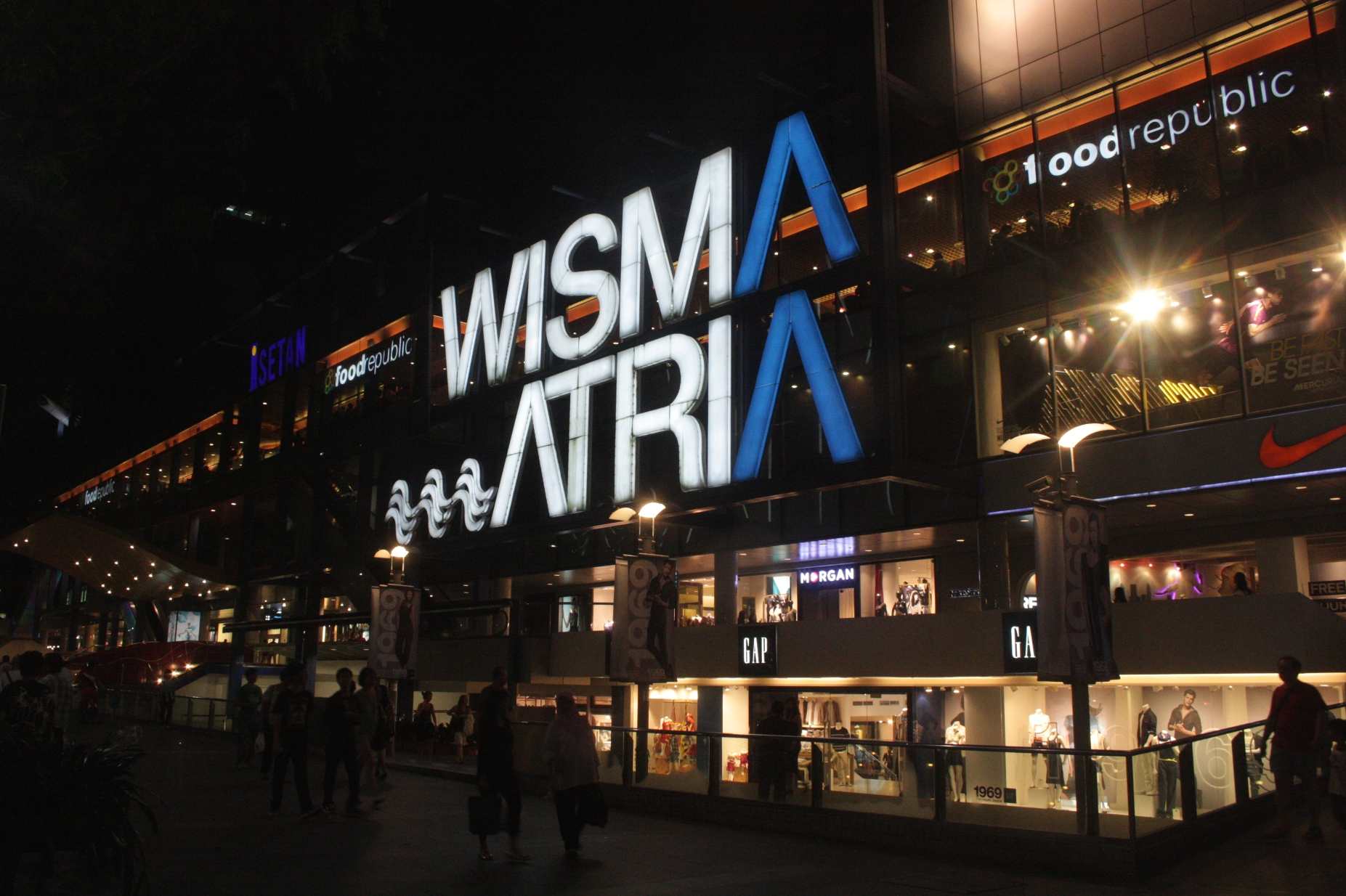
Wisma Atria at night

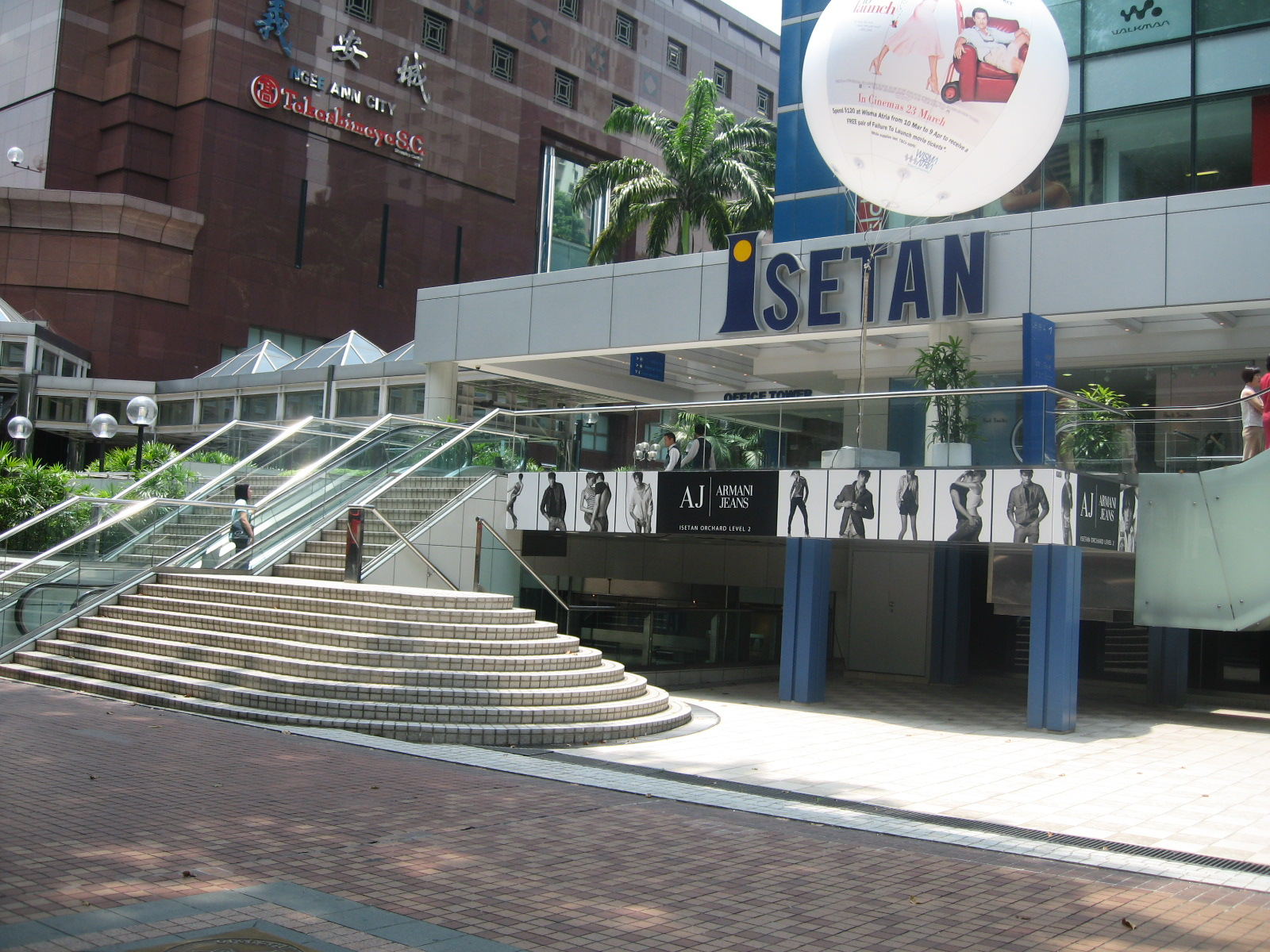
Facade of Wisma Atria 1

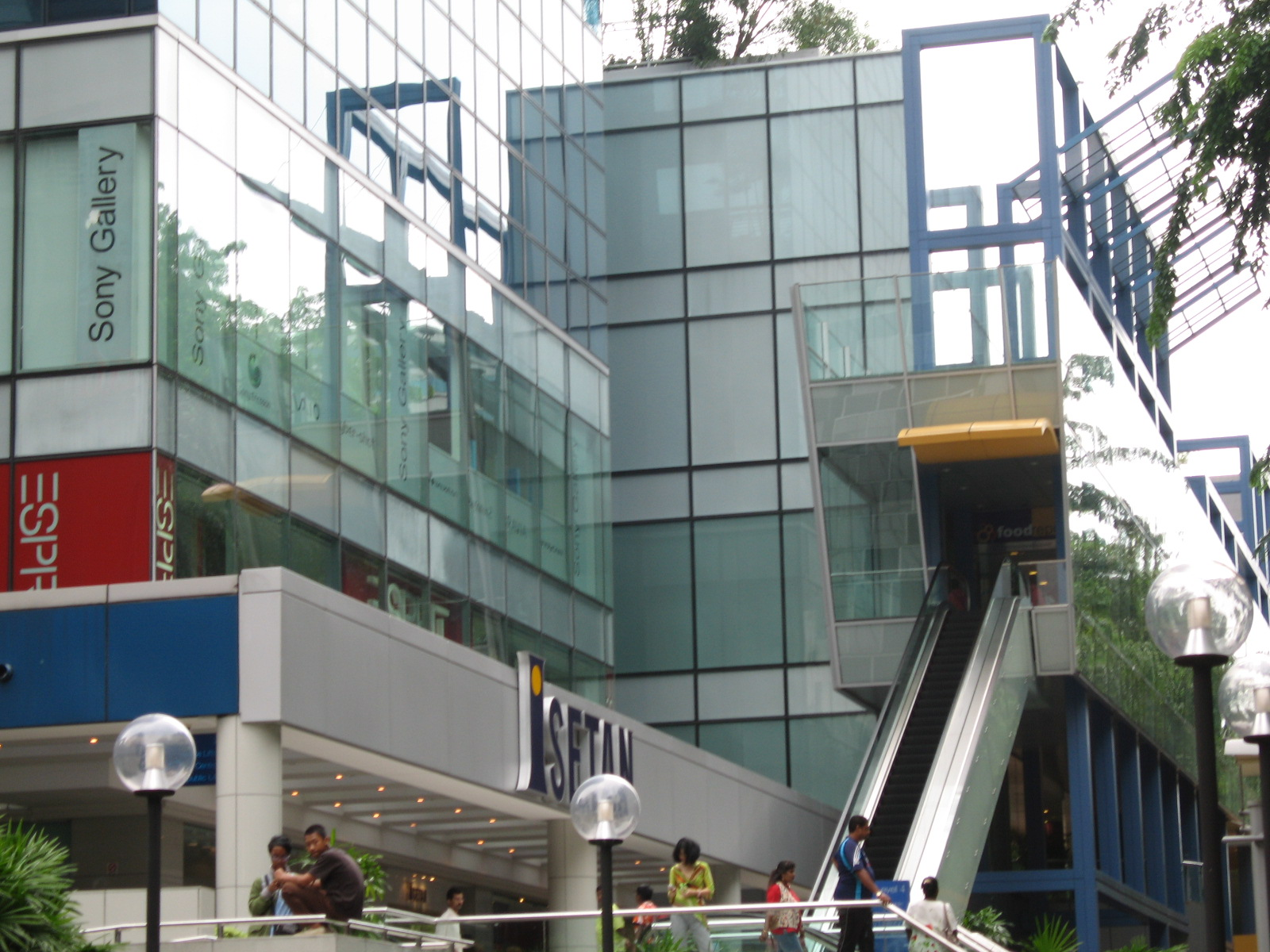
Facade of Wisma Atria 2

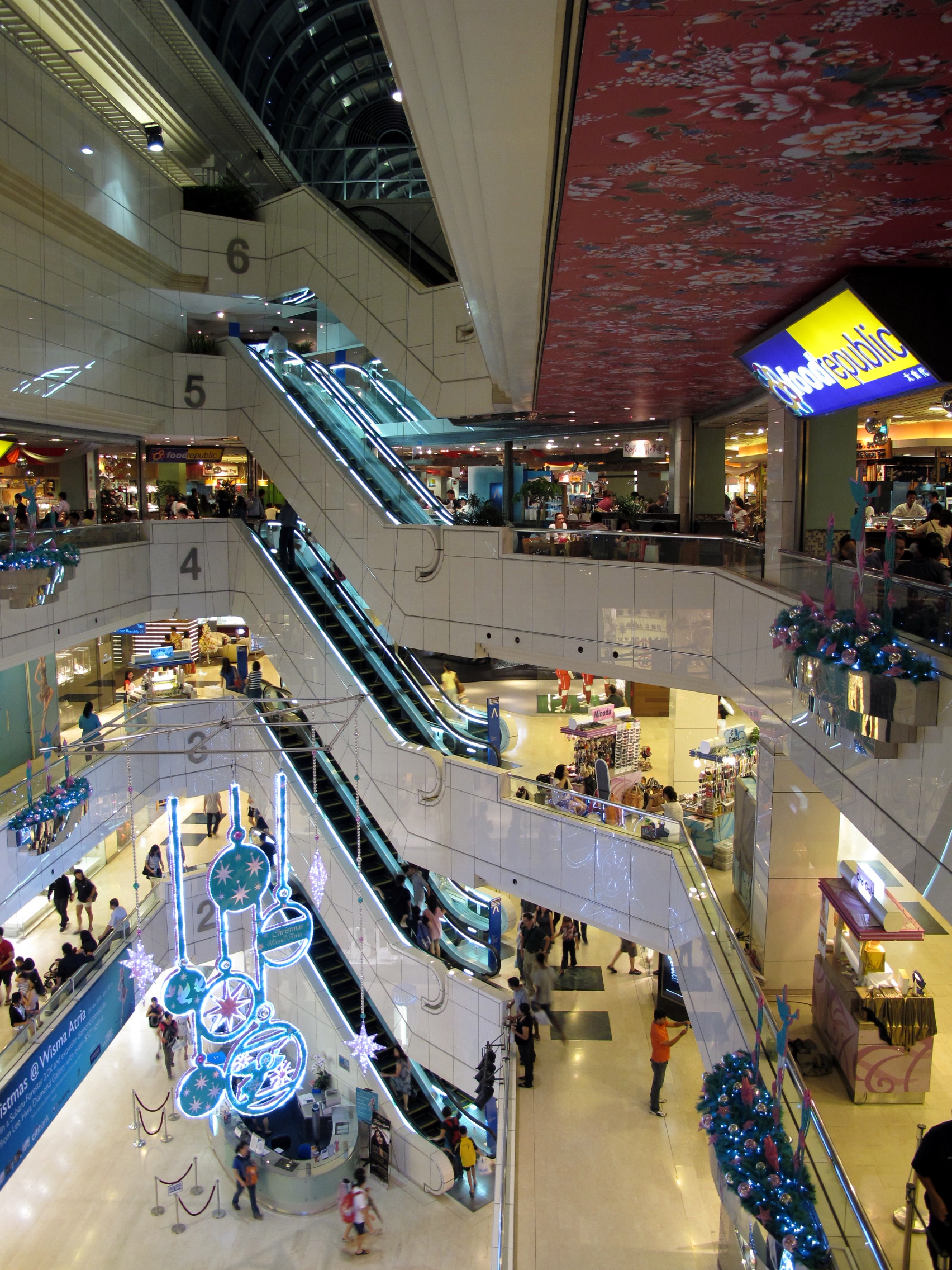
Wisma Atria Atrium
