= 義安 =

義安 may refer to:

- Yi'an District, in Anhui, China
- E An, a military award given to members of the Taiping rebellion
- Ngee Ann, or Yi'an in Mandarin, an old name of Chaozhou
  - Yi'an Commandery (413-590), historically an administrative subdivision of Chaozhou
  - Ngee Ann Polytechnic (Abbreviation: NP) an institution of higher learning (IHL) in Singapore
  - Ngee Ann City, a shopping and commercial centre in Singapore
  - Ngee Ann Kongsi, charitable foundation located in Singapore
  - Sun Yee On (Chinese: 新義安), or New Righteousness and Peace Commercial and Industrial Guild, one of the leading triads in Hong Kong and China

== See also ==
- Yian (disambiguation)
- Ngee Ann (disambiguation)
