= Yian =

Yian or Yi'an may refer to:

== Places in China ==
- Yi'an County (依安縣), a county in Heilongjiang province
- Yi'an District (義安區), a district in Anhui province
- Yi'an Town, Heilongjiang (依安镇), a town and the county seat of Yi'an County, Heilongjiang
- Yi'an, Shijiazhuang (宜安镇), a township-level division of Luquan, Shijiazhuang, Hebei
- Yi'an, Laishui County (义安镇), a town in Laishui County, Hebei province
- Yi'an, Shanxi (义安镇), a town in Jiexiu, Jinzhong Prefecture, Shanxi province
- Yian (乂安), a prefecture in the Chinese province of Jiaozhi in northern Vietnam

== People ==
- Fong Kay Yian (born 1996), Singaporean diver
- Li Yian, Chinese footballer in the 2004–05 Hong Kong Senior Challenge Shield
- Sun Yian, Chinese screenwriter nominated in 1995 for the Golden Rooster Award for Best Writing
- Tan Bee Yian, Singaporean bowler at the 2005 Southeast Asian Games
- Yian Shi, discoverer of Shi epoxidation in 1996
- Yian Yiru (一庵一如), Chinese ambassador during the 1401–1402 Japanese mission to Ming China
- Huang Yian, a name for Yuri Huang (born 1986), Chinese artist

== Fictional ==
- Yian (fictional city), in "The Maker of Moons", an 1896 short story by Robert Chambers
- Yian Yang, main character in the Chinese TV series Beautiful Life

== Other ==
- Yian, a 2023 album by Lucinda Chua

== See also ==
- Empress Yi'an (disambiguation)
