= Ngee Ann =

Ngee Ann (義安) is a former Teochew term for Chaozhou, China, and may refer to the following places in Singapore:

- Ngee Ann City, a shopping and commercial centre located on Orchard Road
- Ngee Ann Polytechnic, an institution of higher learning
- Ngee Ann Secondary School, a secondary school in Tampines
- Ngee Ann Primary School, a primary school in Marine Parade, an urban planning area and residential estate
- Ngee Ann Kongsi, a charity foundation
