= Ng Keng Siang =

Singaporean architect (1908–1967)

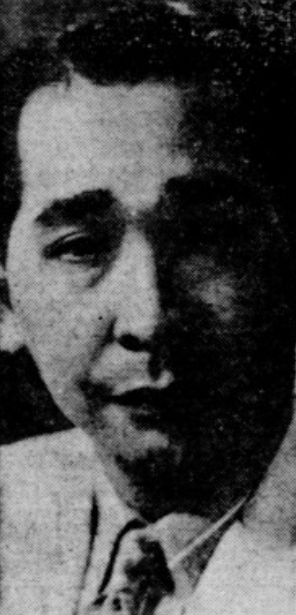
Ng in 1947

Ng Keng Siang (1908 – 6 November 1967) was a pioneering Singaporean architect. He designed several buildings which have since become local landmarks, including the Asia Insurance Building, which was the tallest structure in Singapore at its completion, and the Nanyang University. He was the founding president of the Society of Malayan Architects.

== Early life and education ==
Ng was born the second son of Ng Siak Khuan of Poh Kong Chye jewellers in Singapore in 1908. He studied at the Anglo-Chinese School before becoming an apprentice at S. Y. Wong & Co., an architectural firm. He then left to study at the Bartlett School of Architecture in London. In 1935, while studying at the school, he won the Alfred Bossom Medal and the Arthur Davis Medal. While there, he also studied sculpture and stone carving under prominent sculptor John Skeaping, as well as ceramics, pottery, furniture designing and interior design. In 1936 he was elected as a member of the Royal Society of Arts.After graduating from the school, he furthered his education at the Columbia University in New York City.

== Career ==
Ng returned to Singapore in 1938 and was employed at local architectural firm Swan & Maclaren. In the following year, he registered with the Board of Architects Singapore, after which he established his own architectural firm. He became the first Singaporean member of the Royal Institute of British Architects. Before to WWII, his clients were mainly wealthy members of the local Chinese community. He primarily designed individual homes, as well as shophouses and speculative houses.

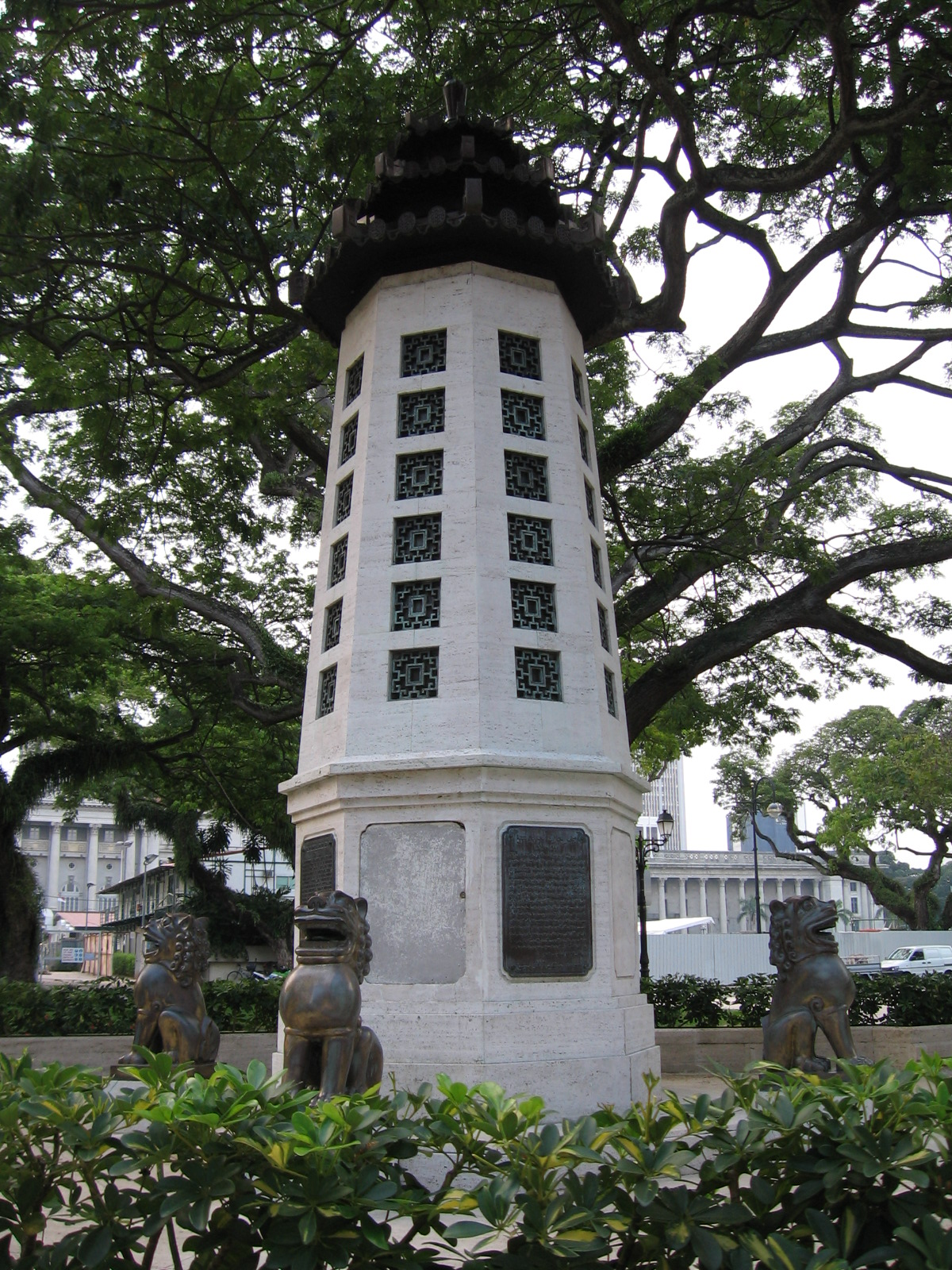
Lim Bo Seng Memorial

Ng designed the Ngee Ann Building on Orchard Road. Completed in 1957, it was among the earliest high-rise private apartment buildings in Malaya. He also designed the Framroz Aerated Water Factory on Allenby Road and the Anglo-Chinese School Clock Tower on Barker Road, as well as the Teochew Building on Tank Road, which houses the Teochew Poit Ip Huay Kuan, the Mahatma Gandhi Memorial Hall on Race Course Lane, the Biltmore Hotel on Trafalgar Street, the Hokkien Huay Kuan Building on Telok Ayer Street which housed both the Ai Tong School and the Chong Hock Girls' School, the Singapore Badminton Hall on Guillemard Road, the Lim Bo Seng Memorial at Esplanade Park and the Nanyang University, the first overseas Chinese university. He designed the Asia Insurance Building on Finlayson Green, which served as the headquarters of the Asia Insurance Company. Completed in 1955, the 18-storey office building surpassed the Cathay Building building as the tallest building in Singapore, a title it held until the completion of The Mandarin Singapore Tower One in 1971. It was also the first skyscraper in Singapore to be gazetted for conservation. When the Society of Malayan Architects, a precursor to the Singapore Institute of Architects, was formed in 1958, Ng was elected its founding president. As the leader of the society, he advocated for the founding of a university-level architecture school. He was also appointed a juror of the Singapore Conference Hall design competition. He believed that architects should "Treat a building like a woman and decorate it like one."

Ng retired as an architect before becoming a hotelier at the Biltmore Hotel in Singapore in 1958. In May of that year, he announced that he would be establishing a special travel department of the hotel to promote the local tourism industry.

== Personal life and death ==
Ng was married with two sons and a daughter. He and his family lived in a house in Pasir Panjang that he designed. He was an amateur hunter and gun club hunter. Hunting flying foxes in Malaysia was a hobby of his. He was an active rotarian. He died of lung cancer at the Singapore General Hospital on 6 November 1967.
