= Asia Insurance Building =

Residential skyscraper in Singapore

Ascott Raffles Place
- 亚洲保险大厦
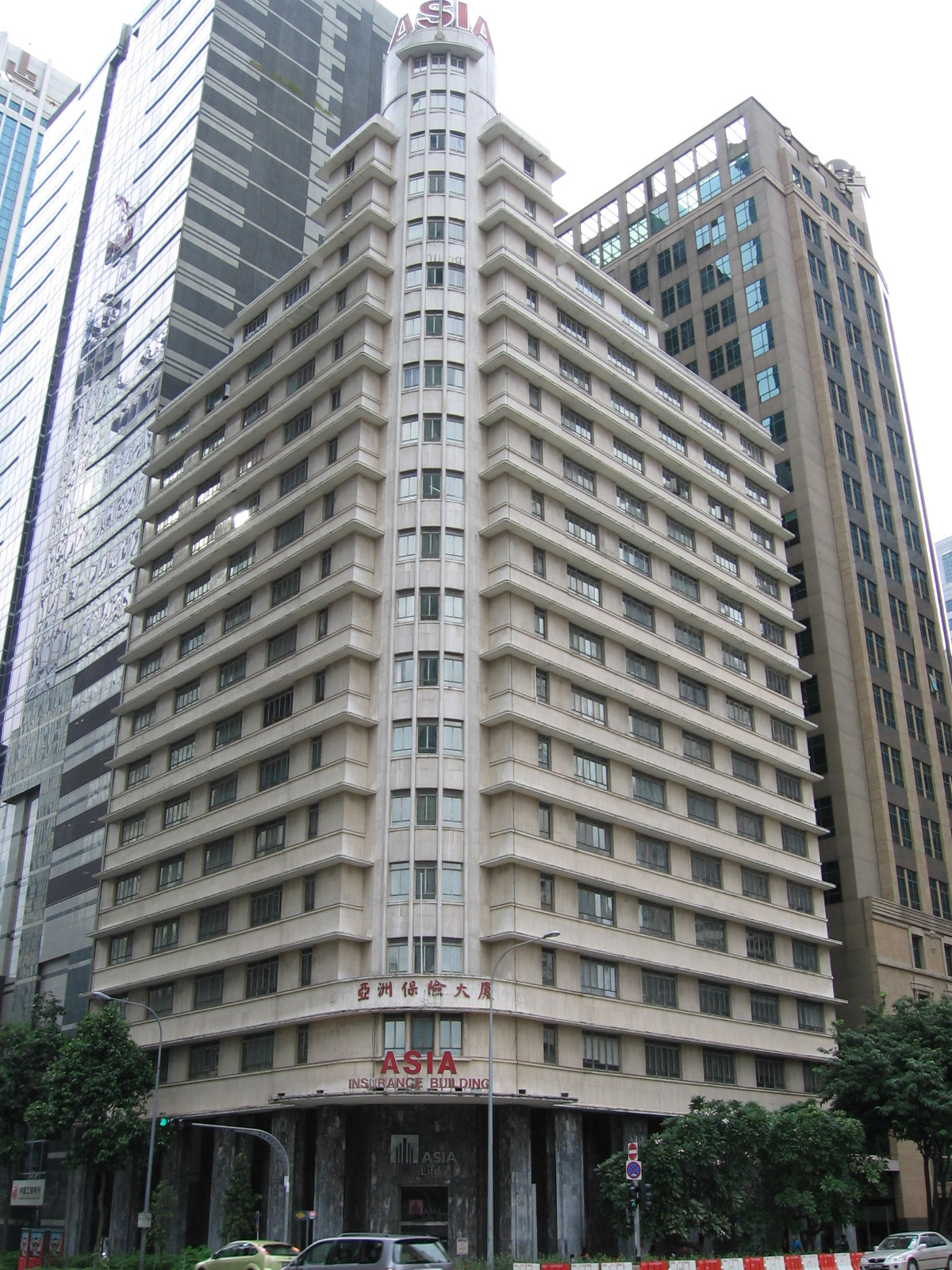
- Interactive map of the Ascott Raffles Place area
- Former names: Asia Insurance Building

General information
- Status: Completed 1954, reopened November 2008
- Type: Residential
- Architectural style: Art-Deco
- Location: Downtown Core, Singapore
- Coordinates: 1°16′55″N 103°51′05″E
- Owner: The Ascott Limited
- Operator: The Ascott Limited

Technical details
- Floor count: 20

Design and construction
- Architects: Ng Keng Siang; RSP Architects Planners & Engineers

The former Asia Insurance Building (Chinese: 亚洲保险大厦; pinyin: Yàzhōu Bǎoxiǎn dàshà), now named Ascott Raffles Place, lies in the heart of the Central Business District of Singapore, at the corner of Finlayson Green and Raffles Quay. Standing at 270 feet (82 metres), it surpassed the Cathay Building to be the tallest tower in Singapore until the completion of Meritus Mandarin Tower 1 in 1971. Designed by one of Singapore's pioneer architects, Ng Keng Siang, the office building was completed in 1955 and served as the headquarters for the Asia Insurance Company, one of the first local insurance companies. In 2006, the building was acquired by the Ascott Group and the office tower has since been refurbished into a serviced apartment residence. Renamed as Ascott Raffles Place, the building sits on a 999-year leasehold site with a building footprint of about 950 square meters.

== History ==
The site was formerly occupied by the Union Insurance of Canton. In 1924, the company vacated and was resided by the South British Insurance Company. In 1947, the site was acquired by the Asia Insurance Company.

The concept of the Asia Insurance Building was crafted by Lee Leung Ki, the first General Manager of Asia Insurance Company. Lee wanted a building that would be a landmark and reflect the financial stability of the Asia Insurance Company. The intention was fulfilled by architect Ng Keng Siang, the first Singaporean to become a member of the Royal Institute of British Architects (RIBA).

=== Building height debate ===
The building was originally designed to be of seven stories but was amended to comply with the request of the authorities for a 15-foot back lane to run behind the back of the building. The loss of this strip of land hence necessitated an increase in height of the building. The newly proposed height of 239 feet was, however, rejected by the Singapore Municipal Commissioners for it violated building by-laws of a maximum 4 to 6 stories. The Singapore Municipal Commissioners recommended the reduction of the building height to 135 feet on both frontages at Finlayson Green and Collyer Quay.

On 20 February 1948, a discussion was held between the Singapore Municipal Commissioners and representatives of the Asia Insurance Company. The Singapore Municipal Commissioners were eventually convinced by Asia Insurance's technical adviser Dato Ronald Braddell, allowing for the building to rise 18 stories, at a height of 241 feet. The committee agreed that the proposed building would, by it majesty, beautify Singapore's waterfront, gaining indirect benefit from its advertisement.

=== Construction ===
Owing to its height, a formal assurance was requested by the Municipal Commissioners to ensure that the soil would be able to bear the load. In February 1949, specimens of soil from the site were sent to Europe for laboratory analysis to determine its bearing capacity. Test results were proven to be satisfactory and construction commenced in early 1950.

However, in 1951, during the execution of the work, the sandstone at depth was found to be core boulders or seams of softer sandstone up to 2 or 3 feet in thickness instead of the previously analysed solid rock. The in rush of soil during the sinking of cylinders through the beach formations aggravated the situation. On the Finlayson Green side, the road showed a series of cracks in the asphalt parallel to the building line and extending a distance of 15 to 20 feet of the center of the road. At the building line, the pavement had sunk between 2 and 3 feet throughout the length of the frontage. The absence of firm rock stratum to support the cylinders as originally designed necessitated a reduction of their bearing pressure. A specialist had to be brought in from the United Kingdom to advise on the project requirements.

To avoid the further risk of loss of ground, the sinking of the cylinders were stopped. The cylinders were carried to their final level (45 to 55 feet below road level) by underpinning them with a precast concrete segmental lining. The bearing pressure was reduced to 3.5 tons per square foot by ‘belling out’ the bases. All cylinders were back-grouted, and also each ring of the lining as it was assembled. In certain cases, underpinning through the beach formations was carried out in compressed air.

After sealing the bottoms of the shafts and encasing the segmental rings in a secondary lining, the tops of the cylinders were trimmed to a common level and a four-foot-thick reinforced concrete raft was cast over them. Into the raft were grouted the holding-down bolts and base plates for the stanchions of the steel superstructure. The 28 cylinders allowed the building load of 35,000 tons to be spread across an area of 9000 square feet. The unexpected soil composition caused the construction to stretch from 1949 to 1955, costing over $8 million, against the expected $3 million, with the earthquake-proof foundations themselves costing $2.25 million.

=== Coronation of Queen Elizabeth II ===
In May 1953, Singapore's waterfront lighted up in celebration of Queen Elizabeth II’s coronation. A giant crown with 4500 electric light bulb was erected on top of the Asia Insurance Building's skeletal structure to mark the occasion. The building has since been decked out with a three-tiered scalloped stainless steel crown to commemorate the event.

=== Opening ===
On 10 December 1955, the Asia Insurance Building was officially opened by Sir Robert Brown Black, Governor of Singapore. To commemorate the event, a plague bearing the architect's name was inscribed at the main entrance.

The Asia Insurance Building was occupied by local and foreign firms, with its offices fully sold before its completion and even after the delays. The Office of the Ceylon Commissioner in Malaya and the Singapore Baggage Transport Agency Ltd. among many others had set up their offices there. One month after the slated completion date of October 1955, the building still had no water and electricity and the lifts and air-conditioning were not yet installed, but some businesses still moved in as scheduled on 1 November 1955. The 18 stories building proposed a new prototype of office buildings, integrating offices, bank, restaurants, public and service areas all in a harmonious whole. The ground floor facing Raffles Quay was occupied by the KLM Royal Dutch Airlines while the Finlayson Green facing area was occupied by the Korean Exchange Bank.

The 18-storey building was the third and tallest skyscraper to be erected in the vicinity during the 1940s, with the Finlayson House and Bank of China Building preceding it. The improvements in building technology and British desire to create a more prominent Singapore skyline fueled the increased construction activity during the 1950s. However, the increased office space provided by buildings like the Asia Insurance Building also began to promote businesses and the service industry boom in Singapore, helping to gradually establish Singapore as a financial centre of the region.

The 14th and 15th floor housed a $500 000 Sky Palace Restaurant, completed with a bar on the 14th floor and garden on the 15th. It was the largest restaurant in Malaya, with accommodation for 800 guests. The 16th floor catered for customers who wish to relax or hold private discussions. It commanded a panoramic view of Singapore and the waterfront.

The Asia Insurance Building was also fitted with many amenities that were considered modern and luxurious at that time. An air-conditioning system by Airtemp was installed in the building and served the first to sixth floors as well as the Sky Palace Restaurant located at the rooftop. Four automated lifts were also installed and were capable of discharging 2500 to 3000 persons per hour, and the entire building was also wired for a centralised telephone system.

=== Suicides ===
Whilst it was the tallest building in Southeast Asia, the Asia Insurance Building, alongside the Upper Pickering Street Flats, saw a record number of people leaping to their deaths. On 20 June 1960, the top floor balcony was eventually closed to the public as a precautionary measure against suicides. Tourists and sightseers who wished to visit must first obtain permission from the Asia Insurance Company.

== Architecture ==
The former Asia Insurance Building was designed by Singapore pioneer architect Ng Keng Siang, the first Singaporean to become a member of the Royal Institute of British Architects. Professionally, Ng was highly respected by the Teochew and Hokkien communities, who previously commissioned him for projects such as the Teochew Association building. Lee Leung Ki's commission to design the Asia Insurance Building, which was to be the tallest building in the city, hence bears the testimony to the confidence and trust the Chinese community held in him.

The Asia Insurance Building was designed in a luxurious Art Deco style, fulfilling Lee's intention to reflect the financial stability of the Asia Insurance Company. The building features an L-shaped plan with a circular concrete canopy and a two-storey corner tower on top of the building. The exterior of the building was lavishly adorned with expensive imported materials, signifying the economic prosperity of the company. The facade of the building was clad in premium Italian Travertine marble. The five-foot way around its perimeter is made from Nero Portaro marble, a rare type of black Italian marble with gold and whitish veins. The building also includes a brass mail chute, designed by James Cutler, where mail could be dropped at a high point and collected at a central depository.

Ng Keng Siang was particular on the need for correct orientation and through ventilation for comfortable living in his buildings. He was acutely aware of the absolute necessity of proper and effective sun-shading and rain protection, and had stressed that the climate and weather conditions of the locality should be ‘the all-important factor every architect has to keep foremost in mind’. The belief is reflected in his design of the Asia Insurance Building through the horizontal overhangs which he said ‘should be wide, roomy ones that drip rain water to the ground far from the wall surface, and double as sun shades as well’. In addition, the volume is punctured by a small air well to provide ventilation to rooms on the inward side of a corridor that runs around the block. The shallow floor plans allows for the building to be naturally illuminated and ventilated by means of operable windows.

== Acquisition ==
As the building did not meet the future needs of the company, the Asia Insurance Company was not keen in conserving the building. They further opposed the Urban Redevelopment Authority's (URA) suggestion to conserve the property as it could hurt its chances of a sale.

In 2006, the Ascott Group eventually bought the building for $109.5 million, recognizing its potential to be conserved and turned into upscale serviced suites. Ascott chose to ride on the building's heritage and refurbish it to provide 146 serviced apartments for business professionals. URA sweetened the deal by allowing it to expand its floor space by 14 percent, equivalent to about 20 more units. On 18 April 2007, the URA officially gazetted the building for conservation.

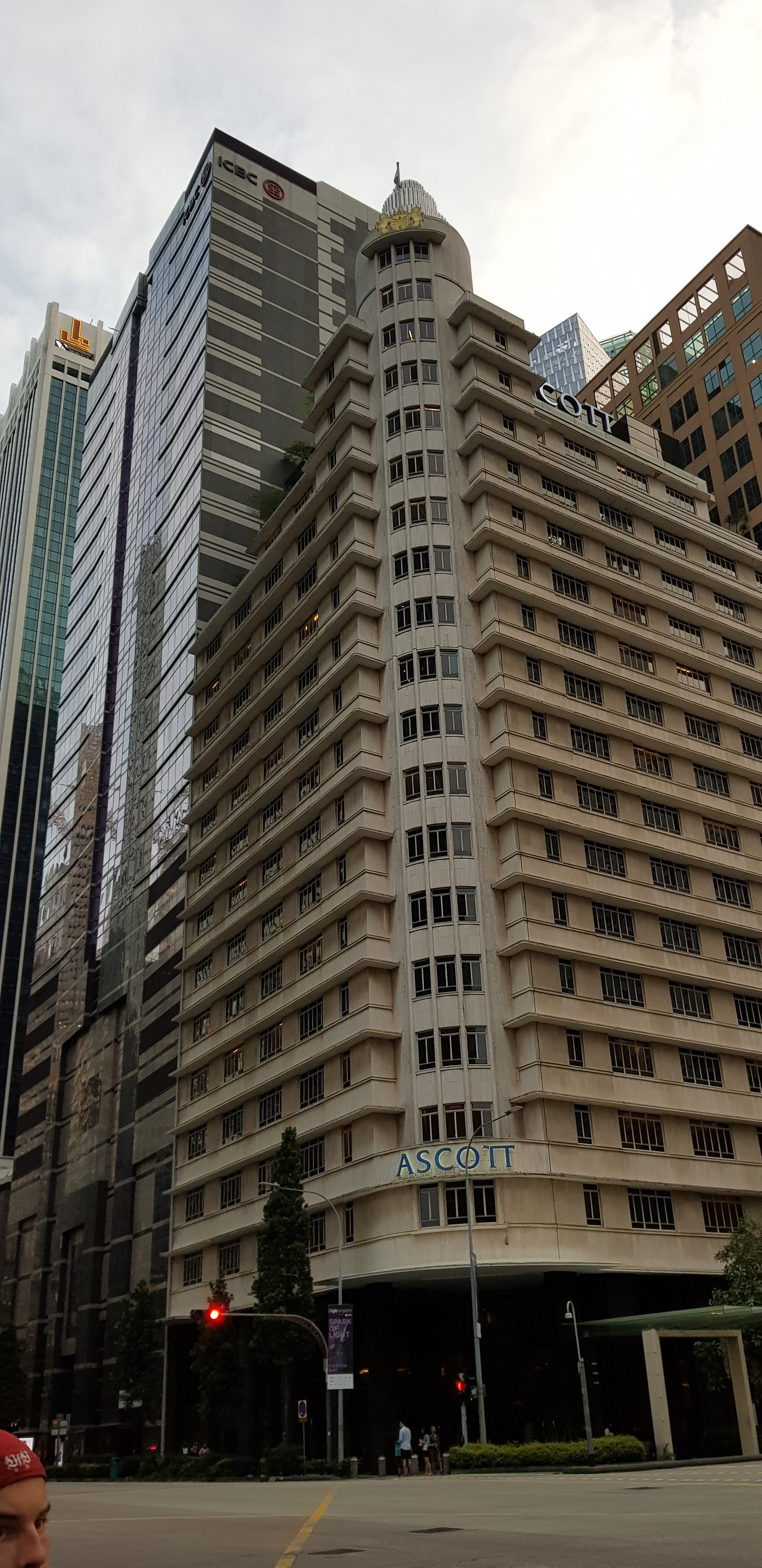
The Building in 2022 (as Ascott Raffles Place)

== Conservation ==
The restoration project was undertaken by RSP Architects Planners & Engineers, costing about $60 million. While features such as the air well were removed to cater to the spatial configuration required, several distinctive features were still retained. Original features such as the brass main chute, for instance, and the ornamental stair railing on the upper floors were kept. A significant portion of the facade that is clad with Italian Travertine has been pin-strengthened and restored to recapture as much as possible the creaminess and tonality of the original stone. The existing Italian Nero stone along the five footway that has undergone significant fading over the decades have been diamond-polished to regain the deep black richness of the original stone. The corner pinnacle at the very top of the building that is made of stainless steel has been re-polished to recapture its gloss. The antiquated window frame with brass handles that required sensitive repair and restoration were replaced with modern, high-performance glass. The sensitively restored building has been creatively and successfully adapted by its current owners. The restoration project led the refurbished building to win the 2009 URA Architectural Heritage Award.

== Representation in the media ==
The Asia Insurance Building was often featured in local and foreign films in the late 1950s and 1960s as a landmark of Singapore and an association with the affluent. Such films include Che Mamat Parang Tumpol (1960), China Wife 唐山阿嫂 (1957) and Azimat (1958).

The restoration efforts by Ascott has also been recognized in several documentary series, including Listen to our Walls, Episode 4 and City Redesign, Episode 1.

Records
Preceded by Cathay Building	Tallest building in Singapore; 87 m (285 ft); 1954–1971	Succeeded by Meritus Mandarin Singapore Tower One
