= Yi'an Town, Heilongjiang =

Yi'an 依安镇
- Town
- Location in Heilongjiang Yi'an (China)
- Coordinates: 47°53′43″N 125°18′19″E
- Country: People's Republic of China
- Province: Heilongjiang
- Prefecture-level city: Qiqihar
- County: Yi'an County
- Elevation: 210 m (690 ft)

Population (2000)
  - Total: 74,233
- Time zone: UTC+8 (China Standard)
- Postal code: 161500
- Area code: 0452

Yi'an (Chinese: 依安; pinyin: Yī'ān), is a town and the county seat of Yi'an County, Heilongjiang, China. It used to be called Tai’an (泰安), but was officially renamed in 1955 to Yi’an (依安) to avoid any possibility of confusion within the city of Tai'an (泰安) in Shandong Province (山東省). It is on the former Tsitsihar-Koshen railway about 100 km (62 mi) west of Bei'an.
