= Yi'an County =

Yi'an County 依安县
- County
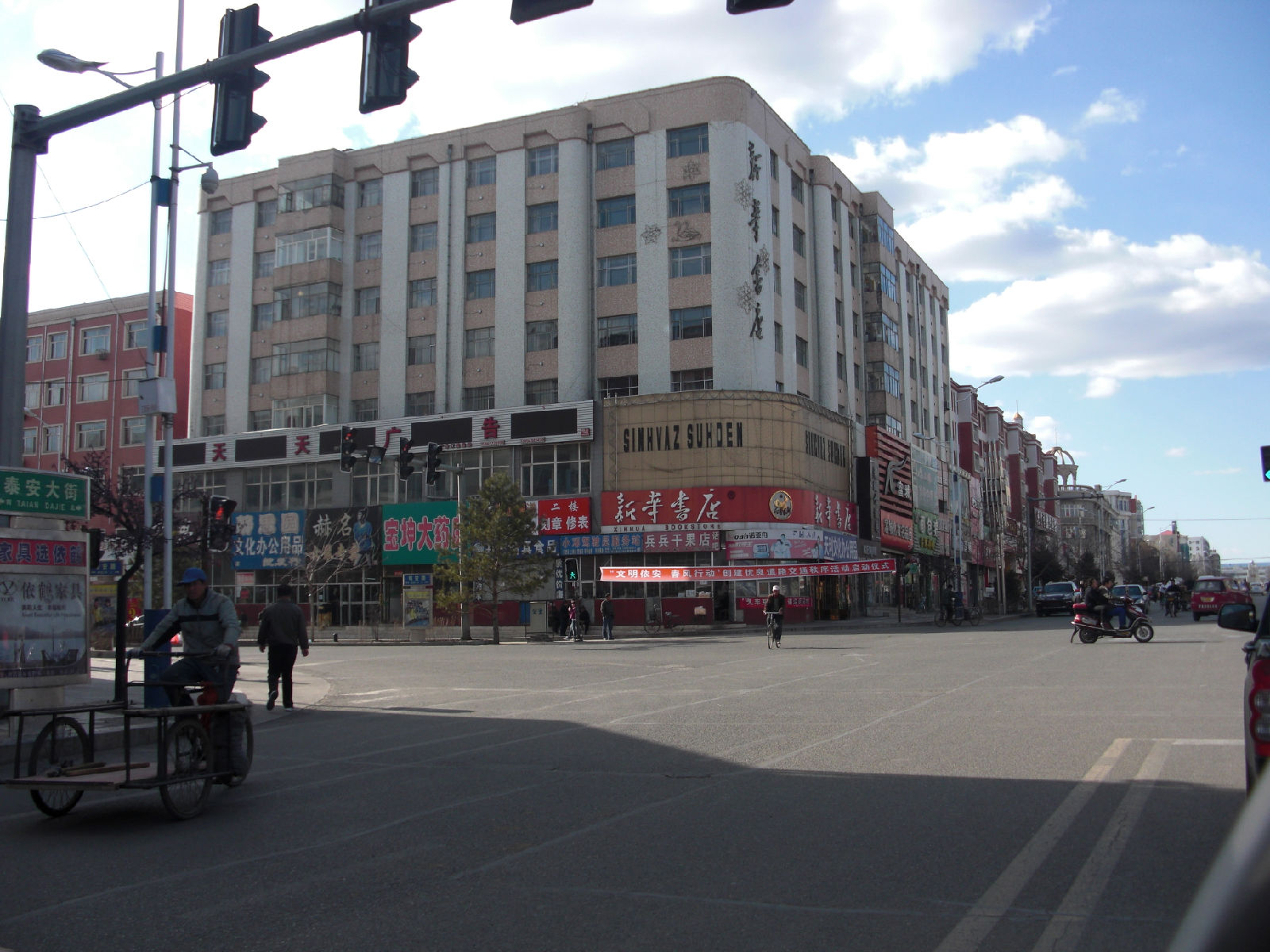

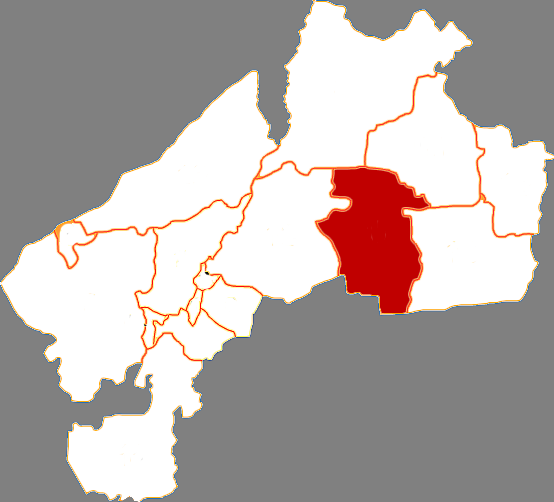
- Yi'an in Qiqihar

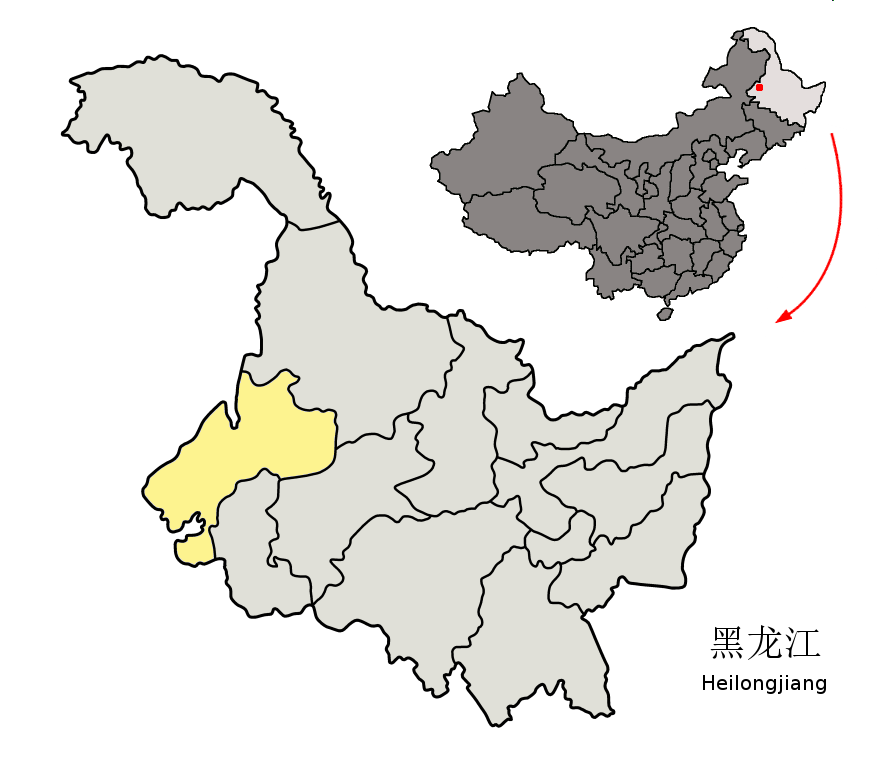
- Qiqihar in Heilongjiang
- Coordinates: 47°53′38″N 125°18′22″E
- Country: People's Republic of China
- Province: Heilongjiang
- Prefecture-level city: Qiqihar
- County seat: Yi'an Town

Area
  - Total: 3,685 km^{2} (1,423 sq mi)
- Elevation: 210 m (690 ft)

Population
  - Total: 490,000
  - Density: 130/km^{2} (340/sq mi)
- Time zone: UTC+8 (China Standard)
- Postal code: 161500
- Area code: 0452
- Website: www.hljyian.gov.cn

Yi'an County (simplified Chinese: 依安县; traditional Chinese: 依安縣; pinyin: Yī'ān Xiàn) is a county in the west of Heilongjiang province, China. It is under the jurisdiction of the prefecture-level city of Qiqihar.

== Administrative divisions ==
Yi'an County is divided into 6 towns and 9 townships.

6 towns

- Yi'an (依安镇), Yilong (依龙镇), Shuangyang (双阳镇), Sanxing (三兴镇), Zhongxin (中心镇), Xinxing (新兴镇)

9 townships

- Furao (富饶乡), Jiefang (解放乡), Yangchun (阳春乡), Xinfa (新发乡), Taidong (太东乡), Shangyou (上游乡), Hongxing (红星乡), Xianfeng (先锋乡), Xintun (新屯乡)

== Demographics ==
The population of the district was 487,777 in 1999.

== Climate ==
Climate data for Yi'an, elevation 226 m (741 ft), (1991–2020 normals, extremes 1981–present)
Month	Jan	Feb	Mar	Apr	May	Jun	Jul	Aug	Sep	Oct	Nov	Dec	Year
Record high °C (°F)	−0.6 (30.9)	7.4 (45.3)	19.8 (67.6)	29.1 (84.4)	35.7 (96.3)	39.0 (102.2)	37.7 (99.9)	35.7 (96.3)	32.6 (90.7)	26.5 (79.7)	13.3 (55.9)	4.5 (40.1)	39.0 (102.2)
Mean daily maximum °C (°F)	−15.1 (4.8)	−9.1 (15.6)	0.7 (33.3)	12.3 (54.1)	20.7 (69.3)	25.9 (78.6)	27.5 (81.5)	25.5 (77.9)	20.1 (68.2)	10.5 (50.9)	−3.0 (26.6)	−13.4 (7.9)	8.5 (47.4)
Daily mean °C (°F)	−20.0 (−4.0)	−15.0 (5.0)	−5.1 (22.8)	6.1 (43.0)	14.5 (58.1)	20.4 (68.7)	22.7 (72.9)	20.5 (68.9)	14.1 (57.4)	4.7 (40.5)	−8.0 (17.6)	−18.0 (−0.4)	3.1 (37.5)
Mean daily minimum °C (°F)	−24.3 (−11.7)	−20.4 (−4.7)	−10.8 (12.6)	0.0 (32.0)	8.2 (46.8)	14.9 (58.8)	18.2 (64.8)	15.9 (60.6)	8.7 (47.7)	−0.3 (31.5)	−12.3 (9.9)	−22.1 (−7.8)	−2.0 (28.4)
Record low °C (°F)	−38.2 (−36.8)	−35.5 (−31.9)	−28.6 (−19.5)	−12.4 (9.7)	−5.3 (22.5)	2.3 (36.1)	8.6 (47.5)	5.5 (41.9)	−4.7 (23.5)	−17.5 (0.5)	−28.8 (−19.8)	−36.6 (−33.9)	−38.2 (−36.8)
Average precipitation mm (inches)	3.4 (0.13)	3.4 (0.13)	6.6 (0.26)	20.0 (0.79)	36.3 (1.43)	89.4 (3.52)	139.3 (5.48)	111.4 (4.39)	56.6 (2.23)	19.4 (0.76)	7.9 (0.31)	5.9 (0.23)	499.6 (19.66)
Average precipitation days (≥ 0.1 mm)	5.9	3.7	4.1	5.9	9.6	12.9	13.5	13.0	9.7	5.7	5.4	7.1	96.5
Average snowy days	7.9	5.3	6.4	3.6	0.3	0	0	0	0.1	2.4	7.4	8.8	42.2
Average relative humidity (%)	72	66	55	47	49	63	75	77	67	59	65	72	64
Mean monthly sunshine hours	195.0	221.3	271.8	260.0	274.2	258.2	241.4	238.8	239.5	212.9	183.4	171.0	2,767.5
Percentage possible sunshine	71	76	73	63	58	54	50	55	64	64	67	66	63
Source: China Meteorological Administration All-time Oct extreme
