= Empress Yi'an =

Empress Yi'an may refer to:

- Empress Dowager Guo (Tang dynasty) (died 848), wife of Emperor Xianzong of Tang
- Empress Zhang (Tianqi) (1606–1644), wife of the Tianqi Emperor
