= Ngee Ann City =

Shopping and commercial centre in Singapore

- 義安城
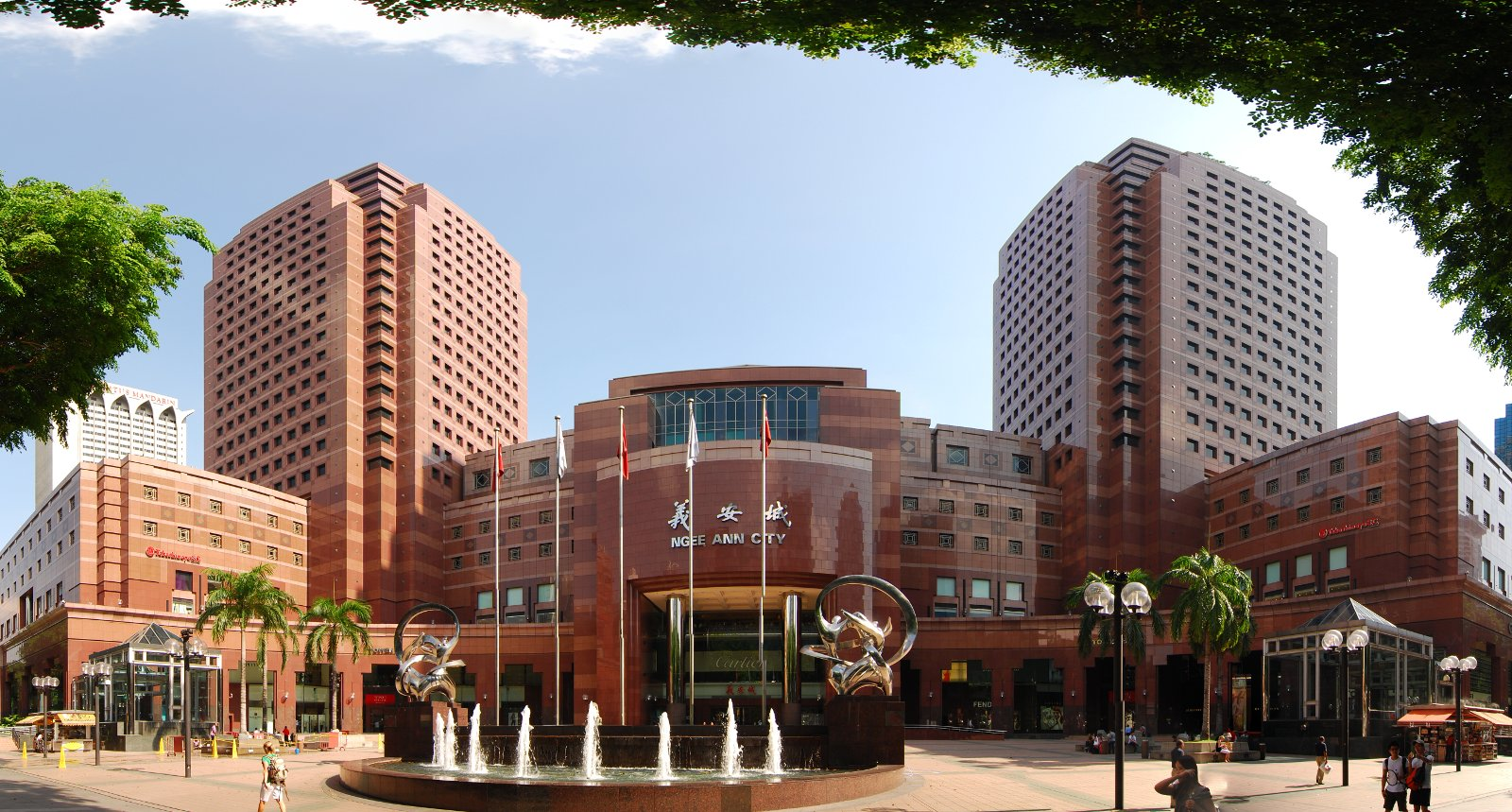
- Panorama of Ngee Ann City complex
- Location: Singapore
- Coordinates: 1°18′10″N 103°50′4″E
- Address: 391 Orchard Road, Singapore 238872
- Opened: 21 September 1993; 33 years ago
- Developer: Ngee Ann Development; Orchard Square Development
- Manager: Ngee Ann Property Management
- Owner: Ngee Ann Development Pte Ltd & YTL Starhill Global Property Management
- Architect: Raymond Woo and Associates
- Num. of stores: 130
- Num. of anchor tenants: 3 (Takashimaya, Kinokuniya & Best Denki)
- Floor area: 1,188,900 square feet (110,450 m^{2})
- Floors: 29 (7 retail floors (B2 to L5), 3 parking floors (B3, L6 and L7), 19 office floors (L8 to L26))
- Public transit: NS23 Somerset; NS22 TE14 Orchard
- Website: ngeeanncity.com.sg

Ngee Ann City (Chinese: 義安城; Pe̍h-ūe-jī: Ngĭ-ang Siâⁿ) is a shopping and commercial centre located on Orchard Road, Singapore. The S$520 million building was officially opened on 21 September 1993 by then-Prime Minister Goh Chok Tong.

== History ==
In the 1950s, the land that Ngee Ann City sits on was a burial ground, owned and managed by Ngee Ann Kongsi. It was part of a parcel of land known as Tai Shan Ting, which was bounded by Orchard Road, Paterson Road, and Grange Road. The ten-storey, mixed-use Ngee Ann Building was then built on the site in 1957, housing shops, clinics and apartments until its demolition in 1985 to make way for Ngee Ann City.

Redevelopment of the site was first considered as early as 1967. Ngee Ann City was planned by Ngee Ann Development and the Orchard Square Development Corporation in the late 1980s. Raymond Woo, the architect who designed the complex, drew inspiration from the Great Wall of China. The intent was to reflect the dignity, solidity and strength of the Ngee Ann Kongsi. Wong spent five years designing and overseeing the project.

Work on Ngee Ann City began 22 years after the project was first proposed. The construction of the S$520 million complex took four years. Ngee Ann City was officially opened by Prime Minister Goh Chok Tong on 21 September 1993.

The National Trades Union Congress' radio operation, Radio Heart, opened its satellite studios at Ngee Ann City in July 1993.

Takashimaya Department Store had its month-long opening celebrations in October 1993.

== Facilities ==
Ngee Ann City has two office towers, Tower A and B which are both 26 storeys high. Among its many shops are the Takashimaya department store and Kinokuniya, the second-largest bookstore in Southeast Asia. Until 2007, it housed the library@orchard, part of the National Library Board on the 5th floor. Ngee Ann City is also home to the largest Best Denki in Singapore, known as Big Best. In 2005, the shopping mall opened an art and creativity section on the 4th floor called iFORUM, the first of its kind in Singapore.

When Ngee Ann City opened in 1993, Tangs Studio (a division of Tangs) occupied three floors of the building at the Tower B section of the building. A few years later, Level 2 of the department store was closed in 1999 due to poor business. This part of the mall became part of the speciality shop section (mainly branded boutiques) on the mall on Level 2, Books Kinokuniya on Level 4, and a section of mainly children's boutiques and shops on Level 4 that was converted to iForum in 2005. The top floor of the mall, Level 5, was part of the upper level carpark. In 1997, the 5th floor was converted to retail space.

The Civic Plaza is where roadshows, concerts, functions, performances and activities are held. There is a fountain at the front of the Civic Plaza facing Orchard Road. The building is connected by underpasses to Wisma Atria, ION Orchard, Wheelock Place, Isetan and Lucky Plaza.

A 24-screen video wall, touted as the first in South East Asia, is located at the Takashimaya Square.

The two towers of Ngee Ann City were intended by the designer to symbolise Chinese door gods, representing strength, generosity, and unity. Tenants in the office tower include Takashimaya Singapore, Books Kinokuniya, Metro department store, Ngee Ann Development, some private office tenants and a medical floor on Level 8 of Tower B.

Toshin Development Singapore Pte. Ltd. manages the speciality stores area of Takashimaya Shopping Centre located from basement 2 to level 4 of Ngee Ann City, covering over 370,000 square feet.

== Gallery ==
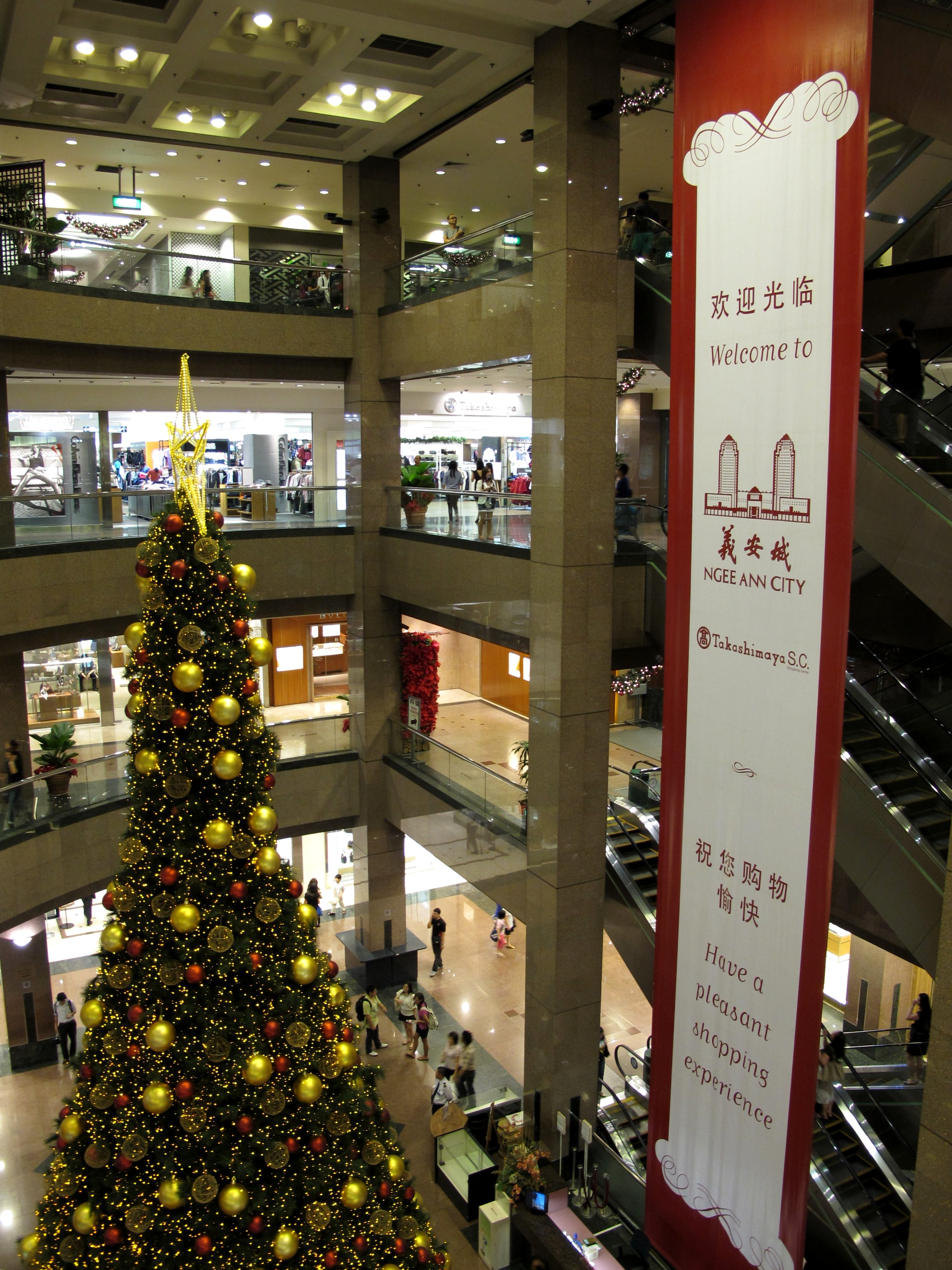
Main atrium of Ngee Ann City, 2010

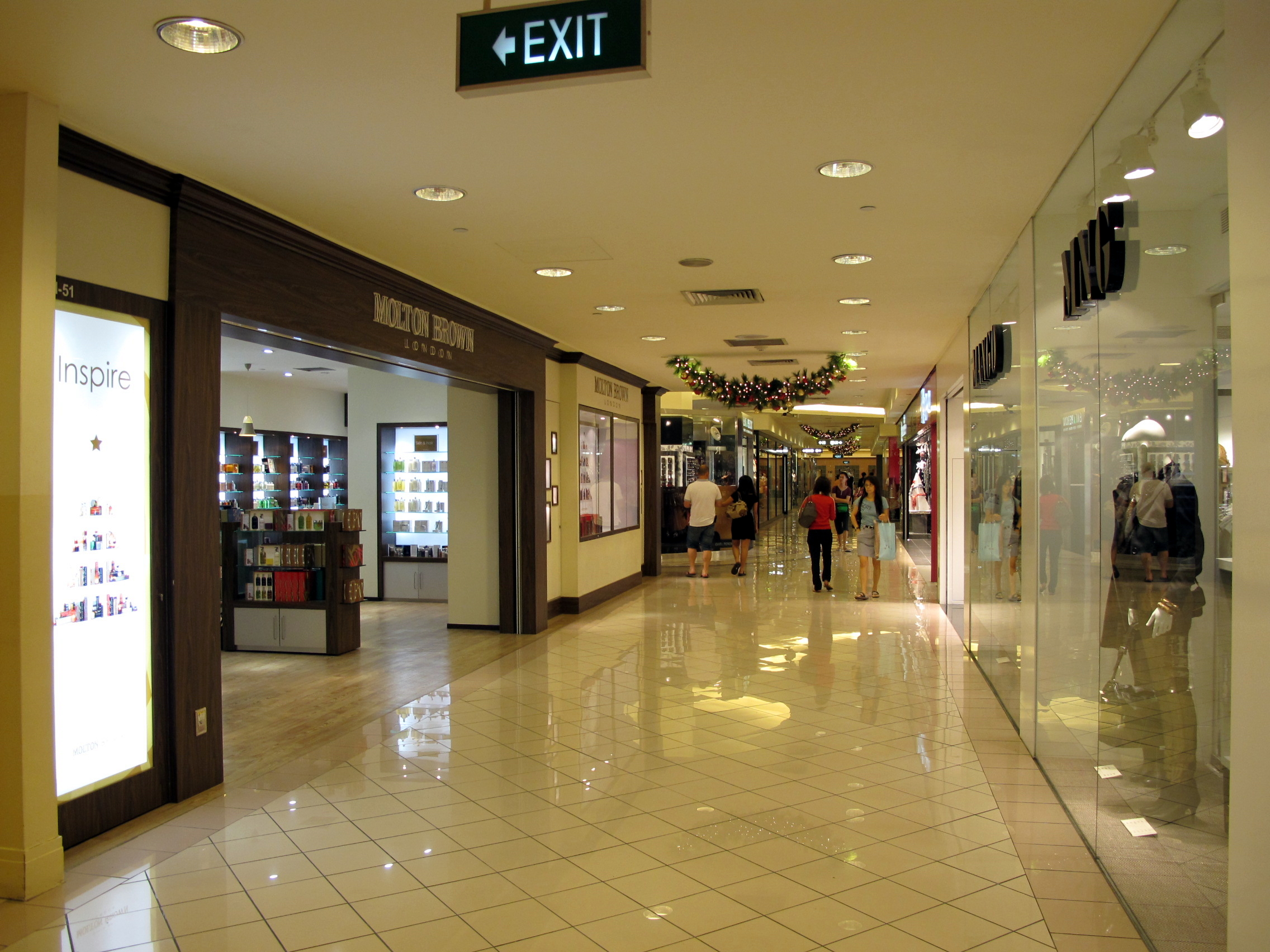
Shops at Basement 1, 2010

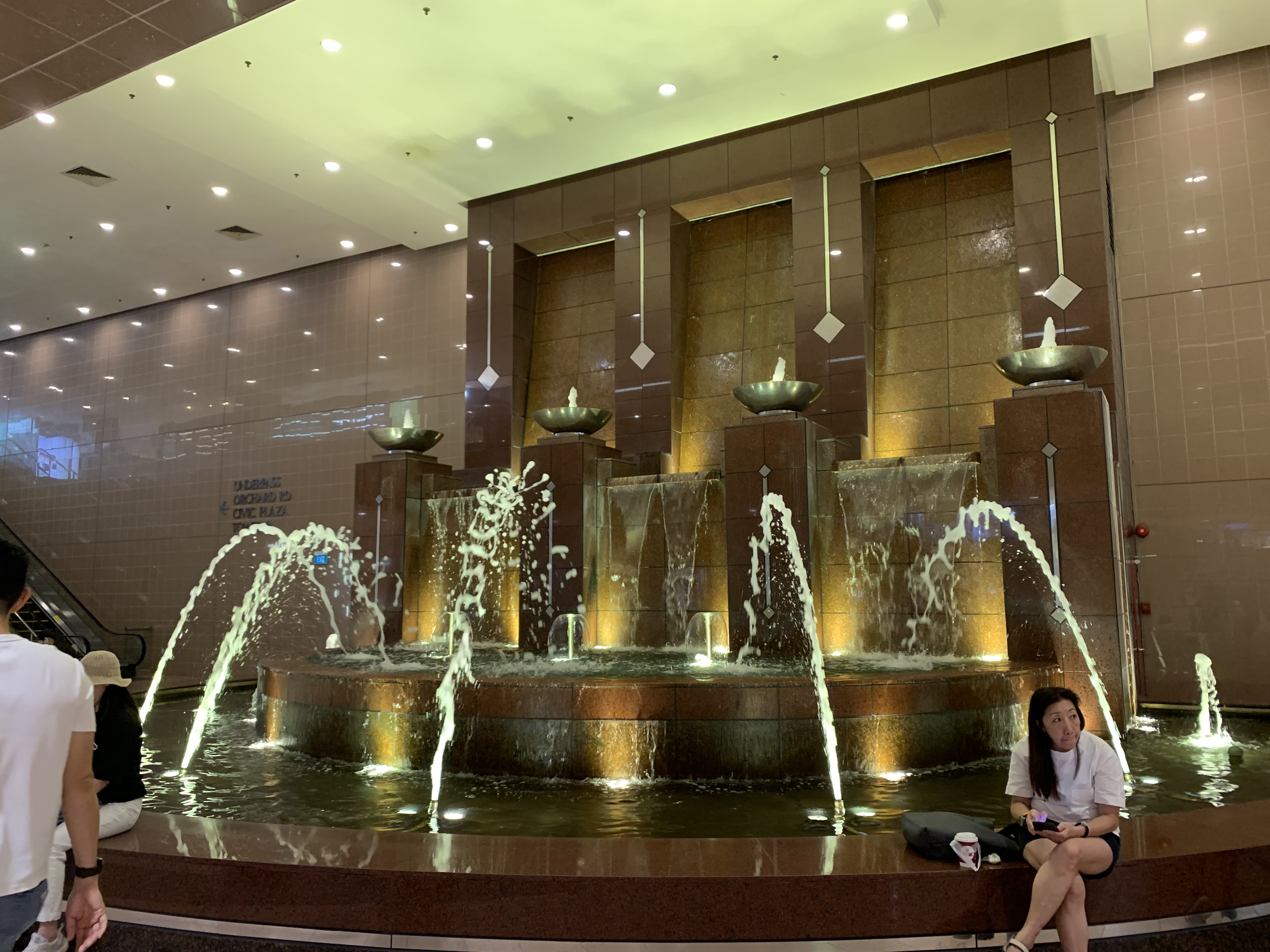
Fountain at Basement 2, 2023

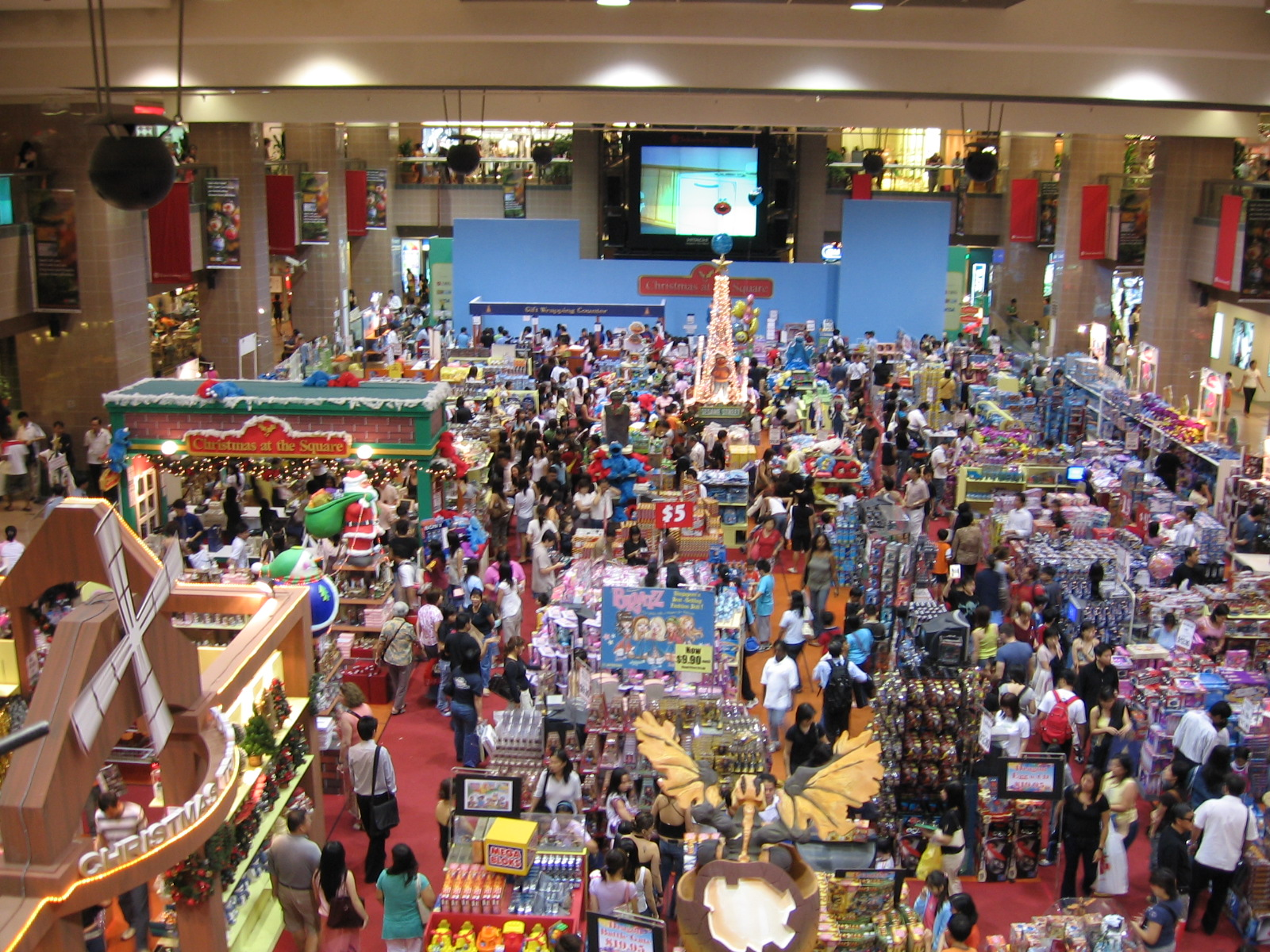
Takashimaya Square at Basement 2, 2005

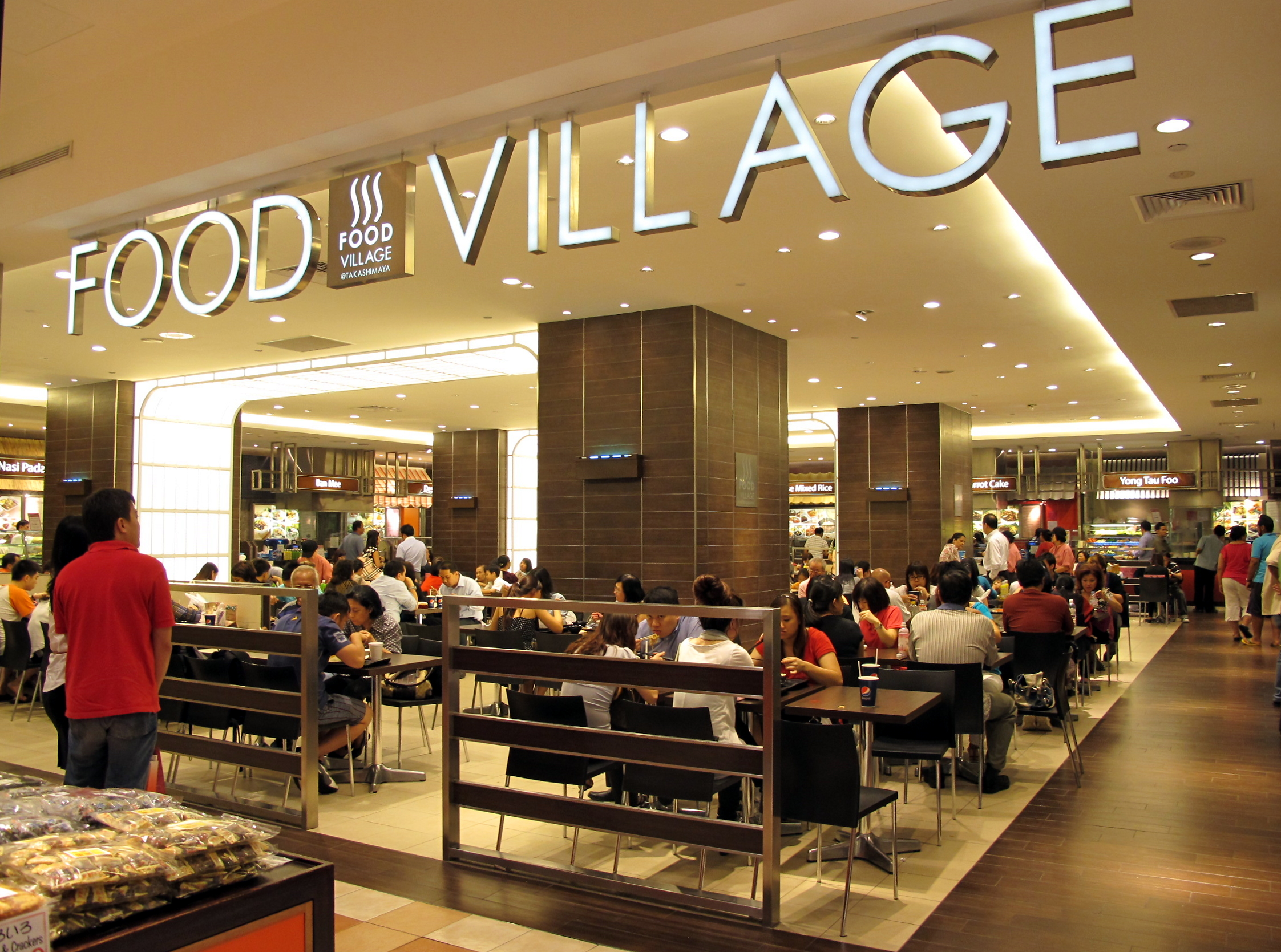
Food Village at Basement 2, 2010

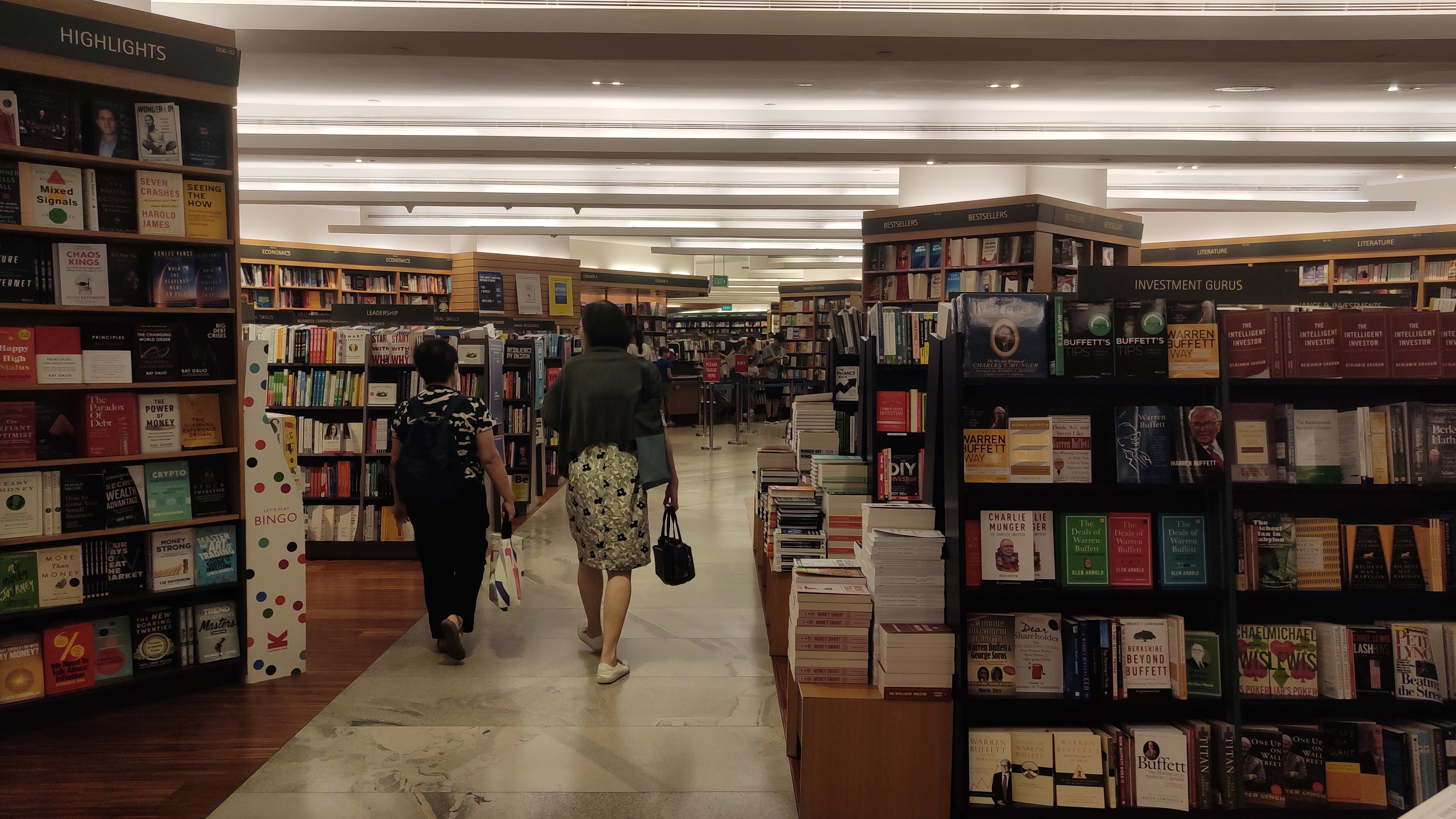
Kinokuniya bookstore at Level 4, 2023

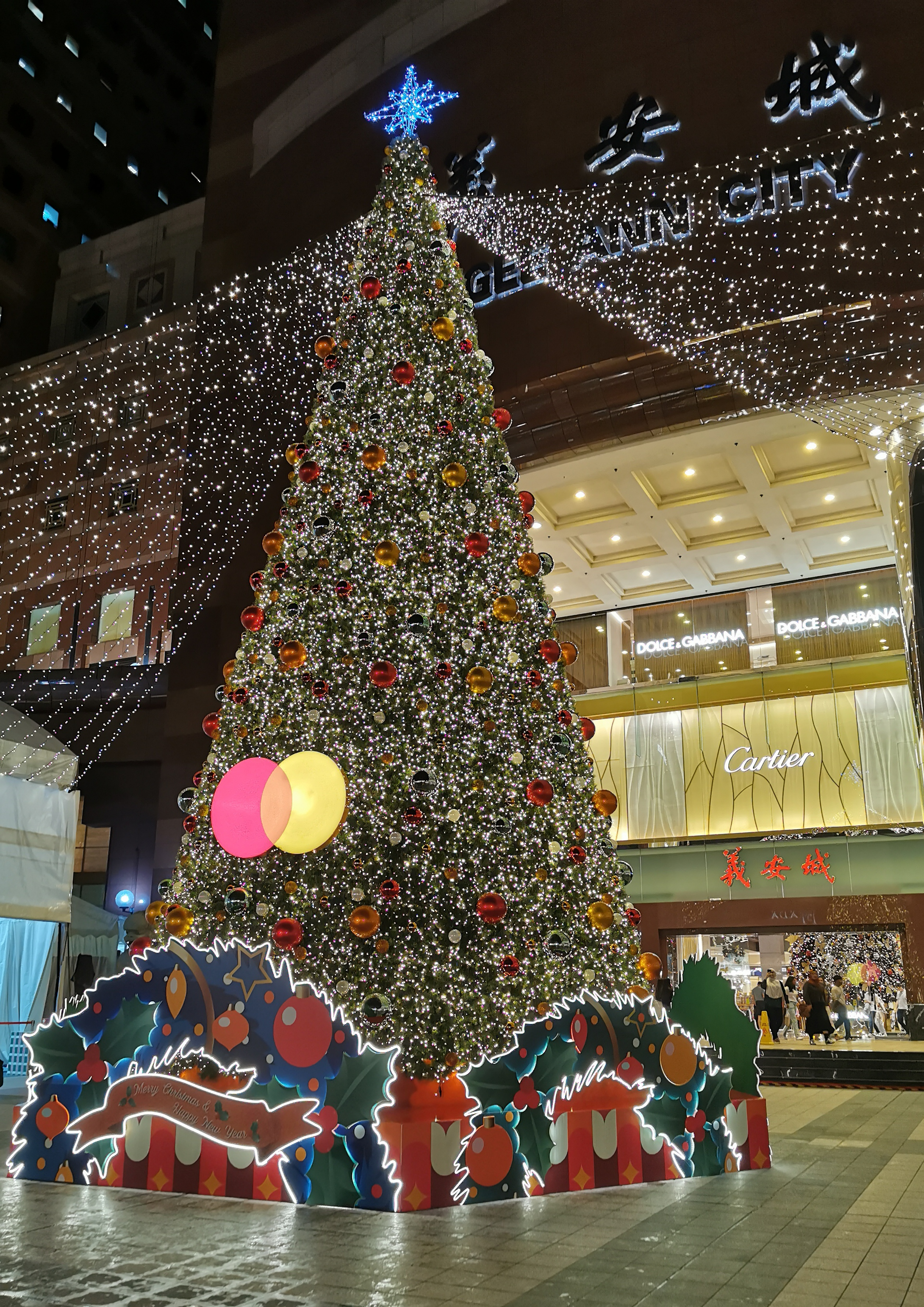
Christmas decorations outside Ngee Ann City, 2025
