= Ngee Ann Kongsi =

Singaporean charitable foundation

Coordinates: 1.2957°N 103.8434°E

- Native name: 義安公司 or 义安公司
- Company type: Charity foundation
- Founded: 1845; 181 years ago
- Founder: Seah Eu Chin
- Headquarters: 97 Tank Road, Teochew Building, Singapore 238066
- Revenue: 43,656,525 Singapore dollar (2022)
- Total assets: 502,005,663 Singapore dollar (2022)
- Number of employees: 33 (2022)
- Website: https://thengeeannkongsi.com.sg/en/

The Ngee Ann Kongsi (Chinese: 義安公司 or 义安公司; Pe̍h-ūe-jī: Ngĭ-ang Kong-si) is a charitable foundation in Singapore and governed by the Ngee Ann Kongsi Ordinance of 1933. It is one of many Overseas Chinese Kongsi, or clan associations, that were set up by immigrants from China in the late 19th century.

The foundation's name, Ngee Ann, is the old name for Chaozhou, which may also be transliterated as Teochew. The Teochew people reside in the eastern part of Guangdong province, China, a distinct racial group sharing the province with other communities such as the Cantonese and Hakka people.

The Ngee Ann Kongsi was founded in 1845 by Seah Eu Chin to look after the religious and humanitarian needs of Teochew immigrants in Singapore. It was set up within Yueh Hai Ching Temple, a national monument of Singapore. Now a non-profit organisation, Ngee Ann Kongsi contributes to Singaporean society through educational and other charitable projects.

The Ngee Ann Kongsi also provides a tertiary bursary and scholarship towards deserving Teochew students. Students that display good academic results, leadership skills and strong co-curricular records are eligible for the scholarship, while students with good academic results and have financial needs can apply to the Kongsi for bursary.

== Assets ==
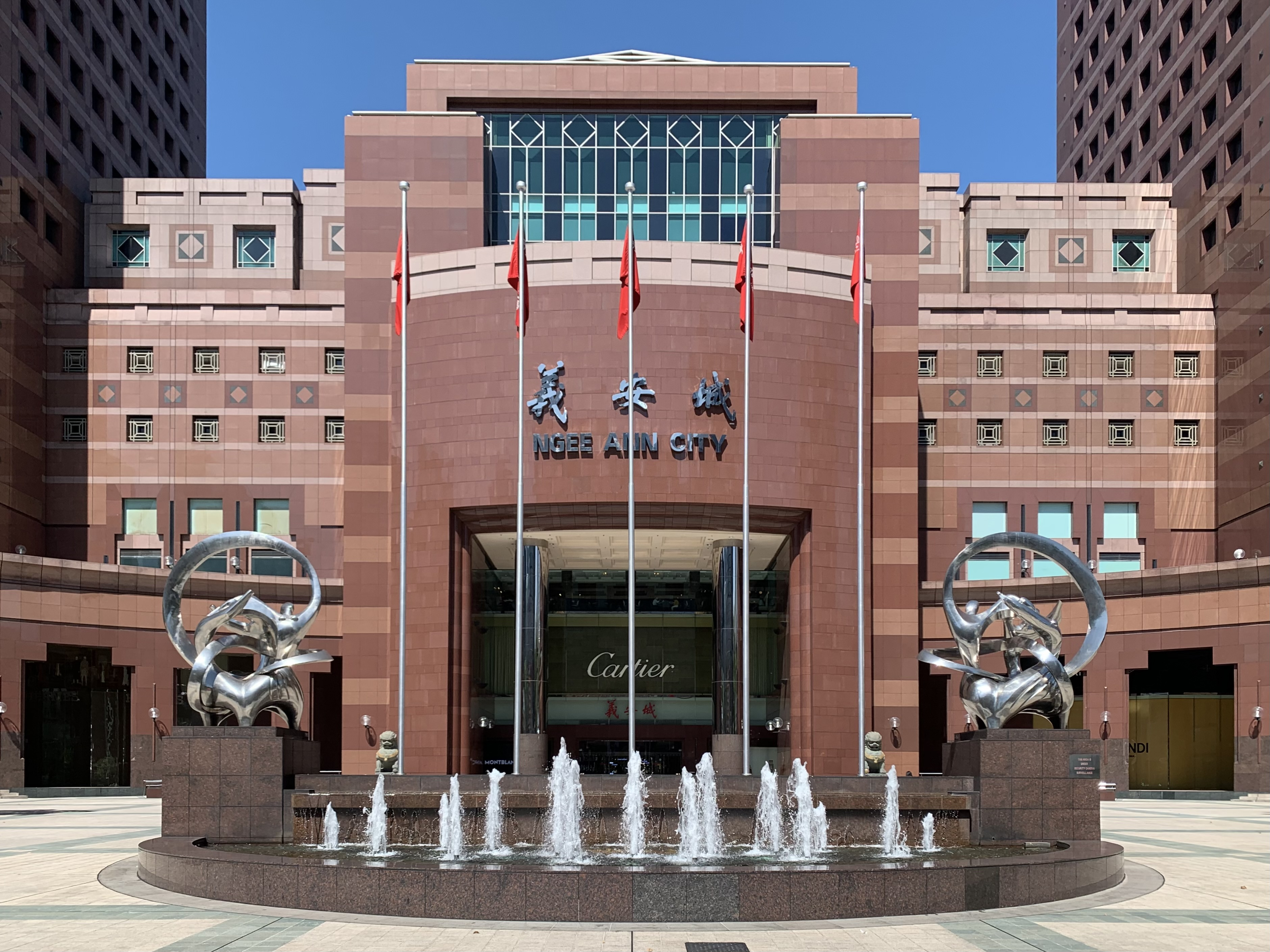
Ngee Ann City

The Ngee Ann Kongsi partially or fully owns and operates the following properties:

Educational Institutions

- Ngee Ann Primary School
- Ngee Ann Secondary School
- Ngee Ann Polytechnic
- Ngee Ann Academy (formerly known as Ngee Ann – University of Adelaide Education Centre)

Cultural Institutions

- Ngee Ann Cultural Center
- Ngee Ann Traditional Chinese Medicine
- Yueh Hai Ching Temple

Commercial Properties

- Ngee Ann City, a large shopping centre
- Teochew Funeral Parlor at Ubi Road
- Teochew Memorial Park at Yishun Ring Road

== Yueh Hai Ching Temple ==
Before clan associations were organised, temples were the focal point of social activity for Chinese emigrants. In 1845, management of Yueh Hai Ching Temple was taken over by the Ngee Ann Kongsi, which acquired the current temple site. Between 1852 and 1855, the temple building was constructed using funds from the Teochew community. It is the oldest Teochew temple in Singapore.

== Ngee Ann Cultural Centre ==
The Ngee Ann Cultural Centre was set up in 1998 in the Teochew Building in Singapore. It aims to promote Singaporean awareness of Chinese culture, in particular Teochew heritage, through the medium of visual and performing arts. The Cultural Centre encourages involvement and engagement among the Singaporean Teochew community and its artists through Chinese calligraphy and brush painting as well as Teochew opera, dance, music, and drama. The Cultural Centre also supports artists and performers by offering exhibition space, facilities, and organisational resources for local and international artistic and cultural activities.

The Centre organises three annual exhibitions: The National Teochew Art and Chinese Calligraphy Exhibition, the Ngee Ann Photographic Exhibition, and the 3D Art Exhibition. The National Teochew Art and Chinese Calligraphy Exhibition occurs on November 19 every year, showcasing amateur and professional artists of Teochew ancestry. The exhibition spans hundreds of contemporary and traditional artworks in diverse media such as Chinese brush painting, calligraphy, watercolours, oils, acrylic and mixed media artwork. It also includes a section showcasing talent from primary and secondary schools. Each year one outstanding artist is selected from the exhibitors and honoured by having their artwork highlighted on the cover of the accompanying souvenir magazine.

It also organised the Ngee Ann Teochew Cultural Festival held annually since 2013.

In accordance with its interest in spiritual well-being, the Cultural Centre hosts many Dharma and Buddhist spiritual talks and initiations by Tibetan and Chinese religious teachers. Inter-religious organisations have also held talks at the centre.

Apart from a spacious exhibition hall and an auditorium, the centre also contains two smaller function rooms.

The current 39th Chairman of the NACC is Ang Hoon Seng, supported by Vice-chairman Phua Bah Lee.

== Ngee Ann Traditional Chinese Medicine Centre ==
The 5,000 sq ft (460 m^{2}) non-profit Ngee Ann Traditional Chinese Medicine Centre was set up in November 2000 by Ngee Ann Kongsi with an investment of $1 million over three years. The centre offers traditional medicine through a partnership with China's Longhua Hospital, whose registrars and specialists provide their services, as well as alternative treatments such as herbal remedies and acupuncture. The Kongsi also continues to research various areas of healthcare, such as meeting the needs of an aging population and exploring the field of alternative medicine.

The current 39th Chairman of the TCMC is Phua Bah Lee, a former Member of Parliament and a director Metro Holdings Ltd and Singapura Finance Ltd.

== Ngee Ann Polytechnic ==
Through the efforts of Dr Lien Ying Chow, who was President of the Kongsi three times in the late 1950s and early 1960s, Ngee Ann Polytechnic began in 1963 as Ngee Ann College, based at the Teochew Building. The college later moved to the Kongsi's land in Clementi, changing its name to Ngee Ann Technical College, before taking on its current name in 1982. Ngee Ann Polytechnic is now internationally acclaimed for its academic excellence and close industry links. Approximately 14 thousand full-time and 5000 part-time students attend classes in more than 20 fields of study, offered by 14 academic departments, at the 36-hectare campus. It is the second-oldest polytechnic in Singapore.

Historically, the Kongsi contributed 75% of its yearly surplus to the polytechnic; to date, it has donated about $100 million to the polytechnic. However, in accordance with an amendment to the Ngee Ann Kongsi (Incorporation) Ordinance, passed in July 2007, the Kongsi has reduced its donation to 25% of the yearly surplus, while the remaining amount will be donated to other educational institutions in Singapore.

Educational institutions that have benefited from this change include:

- School of the Arts (SOTA) – S$12 million
- School of Science and Technology, Singapore – S$8.1 million
- National University of Singapore – S$3 million
- Nanyang Technological University – S$3 million
- Singapore Management University – S$3 million
- National Junior College – S$500,000
- Convent of the Holy Infant Jesus
- Autism Resource Centre
- Jurong Junior College

== Locations ==
Ngee Ann Kongsi's wholly owned divisions (Ngee Ann Property & Management Pte. Ltd. and Ngee Ann Development Pte. Ltd.) are both housed within Ngee Ann City's Tower A, whereas Ngee Ann Kongsi, Ngee Ann Education Holdings Pte. Ltd., Ngee Ann Knowledge Center, Ngee Ann Cultural Center Pte. Ltd., and Ngee Ann - Adelaide Education Center are situated within the Teochew Building (formerly Tuan Meng High School).
