= Robert Ng =

Singaporean billionaire businessman

Robert Ng Chee Siong
- 黄志祥
- Born: 1952 (age 73–74); Singapore
- Occupation: Businessman
- Known for: 1987 Hong Kong Futures Exchange collapse
- Title: Chairman, Sino Group
- Term: 1991-
- Spouse: Yeoh Saw Kheng
- Children: 6, including Daryl Ng Win Kong
- Parent: Ng Teng Fong
- Relatives: Yeoh Ghim Seng (father-in-law)

Robert Ng Chee Siong (黄志祥, Báⁿ-uā-ci̍: Ńg Ci̍-sió̤ng; pinyin: Huáng Zhìxiáng; Jyutping: wong4 zi3 coeng4; born 1952) is a Singaporean billionaire businessman, and the chairman of Hong Kong property development conglomerate Sino Group since 1991.

He is the eldest son of Ng Teng Fong, a Singaporean real estate billionaire. Forbes listed them together as the 30th richest people in the world in 1997. As of July 2017, Robert, along with his brother Philip Ng, has an estimated net worth of $9.7 billion. He is an Honorary Fellow (Foundation Fellow) of Somerville College, Oxford.

== Career ==
Ng was speculating in futures contracts on the Hong Kong Futures Exchange through two Panamanian-registered companies when the October 1987 global stock market crash began; his paper losses reportedly reached HK$1 billion. At first, Ng refused to pay, claiming to be protected by the limited liability of the companies through which he had traded. This led to the collapse of the futures exchange; trading was also halted on the Hong Kong Stock Exchange for four days. An investigation by the Commercial Crime Bureau of the Royal Hong Kong Police revealed that Ng had avoided required margin calls through collusion with one of his brokers. However, in the end, no charges were laid against Ng because the colonial government of Hong Kong felt that prosecuting him would pose a risk to overall market stability. Instead, a deal was worked out which saw Ng repay HK$500 million, with Hong Kong taxpayers providing the rest of the funds needed by the Exchange through a government bailout. Ng reportedly lost a total of US$250 million in his various investment holdings as a result of the crash.

In June 1995, Ng took over as chairman of Yeo Hiap Seng (YHS), a Singapore-listed food and beverages company which had lost US$3.2 million in its previous year of operation. His chairmanship came at the same time as his family increased its stake in the company to 24.9%, just short of the 25% threshold above which they would be required by law to make an offer to buy out all other shareholders. This marked a step forward in his fight with Malaysian billionaire investor Quek Leng Chan for control of YHS and its land holdings in Singapore's Bukit Timah district, which could be worth billions of dollars were they redeveloped into residential real estate. In the end, Ng and his father were able to successfully take advantage of squabbles within the Yeo family to buy up 86% of YHS' stock. Their battle to gain control of the company was later described as "one of the most colourful take-over struggles in Singapore history" and led to YHS' transformation from a food company to a luxury real estate developer.

The Sino Group also spun off their hotel interests into a new company, Sino Hotels, in that year; Ng became chairman of the board of the new company as well from its inception. In early 1997, under Ng's direction, Sino Hotels made several acquisitions, including an 80% stake in the local branch of the Conrad Hotel for HK$2 billion. Ng also predicted that office properties would perform well during that year. For the latter six months of that year, Sino Hotels reported a 66% fall in net interim profits and 80% fall in operating profit, which Ng attributed to lower contributions not just from hotels but from the company's Fortune chain of Chinese restaurants as well. However, the Conrad proved to be a resilient investment, with the average room rate increasing by 14.7% during the months in question.

=== Positions ===
As of 2009, Ng is the director of a number of subsidiaries and associated companies of Sino Group:

1. Chairman of Tsim Sha Tsui Properties Limited, parent company of Sino Land
2. Chairman of Sino Hotels (Holdings) Limited
3. Independent non-executive director of The Hongkong and Shanghai Hotels, Limited
4. Director of the Real Estate Developers Association of Hong Kong
5. Member of the 11th National Committee of the Chinese People's Political Consultative Conference
6. Non-executive director of SCMP Group Limited from May 2004 to May 2007
7. Chairman of the Singapore Chamber of Commerce (Hong Kong) since its inception in 1995

== Voting and political views ==
Due to his business positions, Ng wields a significant amount of power under Hong Kong's functional constituency system. In 1998, he and companies owned by Sino Group controlled roughly 3–4% of the votes in the real estate constituency, and an additional two votes in the tourism constituency. The voting power he wields through this system has been described as equivalent to anywhere from 6,100 to 15,940 votes in geographic constituencies, which has led to criticism by the Hong Kong Human Rights Monitor.

Ng has spoken out in support of the "Application List" system for the sale of government land and in 2008 remained publicly optimistic about the prospects for the Hong Kong property market.

In December 2021, it was reported that Ng was eligible to vote four times in the 2021 Hong Kong legislative election, yielding 0.0347375% of the total voting value (elected seats), which is 6989 times more than the value of an average voter's total voting value.

In 2024, Robert Ng and three of his children, Daryl, Nikki, and David, declared that that they were Singaporean citizens, and also served as CPPCC members.

== Personal life ==
Ng is married to Yeoh Saw Kheng who is the third daughter of Yeoh Ghim Seng, the former Speaker of the Parliament of Singapore. Robert Ng is a staunch Christian and refers to Far East Organization as a Christian enterprise.

Ng's eldest son Daryl Ng Win Kong was born in Hong Kong in 1978 but holds Singaporean citizenship. He is the deputy chairman of Sino Group and the Chairman of Yeo Hiap Seng.

Ng's eldest daughter, Nikki Ng Mien Hua (黃敏華) attended Yale University as an undergraduate, and went on to receive a master's degree from the University of London's School of Oriental and African Studies. She was later appointed to the position of general manager of the Sino Group. Her activities outside of Sino Group include membership of the 11th Qingdao Chinese People's Political Consultative Conference. Ng also has two younger daughters Jeanne Ng Mien Yi (黃敏儀) and Christine Ng Mien Yin (黃敏音).

Beginning in the late 1990s, the family became more active in the Hong Kong Jockey Club. Daryl, Nikki, and Jeanne own four horses between them, while the elder Ng himself owns eight and his wife one. At one point in 2002, Ng was said to be interested in joining the 12-member board of stewards of the Hong Kong Jockey Club; however, some of the club's 200 voting members objected due to Ng's conduct during the futures market collapse in 1987.

Both Daryl and Nikki are members of the five-person board of the Hong Kong Heritage Conservation Foundation.
