= Sino Hotels =

Hong Kong hotel company

Sino Hotels (Holdings) Limited 信和酒店(集團)有限公司
- Company type: Listed company
- Industry: Hotel management
- Founded: 1994
- Headquarters: Hong Kong, People's Republic of China
- Area served: Hong Kong
- Key people: Chairman: Mr. Robert Ng
- Owner: Sino Group
- Website: Sino Group

Sino Hotels (Holdings) Limited (SEHK: 1221) is a hotel operator based in Hong Kong but incorporated in the Cayman Islands. It is affiliated with Sino Land Company Limited in Hong Kong and the Far East Organization in Singapore.

== Hotels ==
=== Hong Kong ===
Sino Hotels operate 6 hotels in HK :

- City Garden Hotel
- Hong Kong Gold Coast Hotel
  - Gold Cost Yacht and Country Club
- Island Pacific Hotel
- The Royal Pacific Hotel and Towers Hong Kong
- The Olympian Hong Kong
- The Pottinger Hong Kong
- The Fullerton Ocean Park Hotel Hong Kong

=== Singapore ===
In Singapore, Sino Hotels operate the Fullerton brand :

- Fullerton Hotel
- Fullerton Bay Hotel

=== Australia ===
In Australia, Sino Hotels operate one hotel in Sydney.

- The Fullerton, Martin Place, Sydney

== Board members ==
Sino Hotels' board consists of 8 directors including the chairman, Robert Ng.

=== Executive Directors ===
- Robert Ng Chee Siong (Chairman)
- Daryl Ng Win Kong (黃永光), the eldest son of chairman Robert Ng, (Deputy Chairman)

=== Non-Executive Directors ===
- Ronald Joseph Arculli
- Gilbert Lui Wing Kwong

=== Independent Non-Executive Directors ===
- Peter Wong Man Kong
- Steven Ong Kay Eng
- Wong Cho Bau
