= Lucas Chow =

Lucas Chow Wing Keung
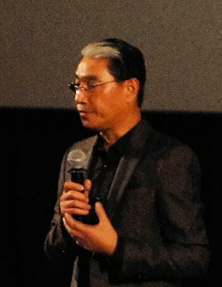
- Lucas Chow speaking at the movie premiere of It's a Great, Great World
- Born: 1953 or 1954 (age 71–72); Hong Kong
- Education: University of Aston
- Occupations: Chairman, Health Promotion Board

Lucas Chow Wing Keung is the former chief executive officer of MediaCorp and SingTel Mobile. Currently he is the group chief executive officer and managing director of Far East Orchard.

He is currently the chairman of Health Promotion Board and a member of the board of trustees of National University of Singapore

== Early life ==
Chow was born in Hong Kong and subsequently granted Singapore citizenship. He graduated with a Bachelor of Science (Honours) degree from the University of Aston, United Kingdom.

== Career ==
Chow started his career at Hewlett-Packard, where he worked for over 20 years and eventually became the company's head in Singapore.

He joined SingTel in May 1998 and was subsequently appointed chief executive officer of SingTel Mobile. In July 2000, he was appointed executive vice-president of consumer business and responsible for the fixed-line, multimedia and mobile communications services. He assumed the position of executive vice-president of corporate business in April 2004, looking after the telecommunications needs of corporate customers.

He joined MediaCorp in 2005. During his tenure at Mediacorp, he served as the chairman of Smart Alliance, a regional broadcasters’ association, to cooperate along three areas — content, sales and marketing, and technology — and capitalise on the economies of scale and combined market that the region can offer.

He relinquished his position as CEO of MediaCorp in July 2011. and assuming the post of executive director at Far East Organization (FEO).

In March 2012, Chow was appointed the CEO of Far East Orchard (previously known as Orchard Parade Holdings), a subsidiary of FEO. He was re-designated as group chief executive officer and managing director on July 12, 2012.

In June 2014, FEO announced that Chow will retire on September 1, 2014.
