= Tingfang =

Tingfang could refer to:

- Bie Tingfang (Chinese: 别廷芳), Republic of China general
- Huang Tingfang (Chinese: 黄廷方; 1928–2010), Singaporean real estate tycoon
- Wu Ting-fang (Chinese: 伍廷芳), Chinese politician and writer
