= Daryl Ng =

Singaporean businessman

Daryl Ng SBS, JP
- 黃永光
- Born: Ng Win Kong; 1978 (age 47–48); British Hong Kong
- Education: Columbia University (BA)
- Occupations: businessman; company director
- Board member of: Tsim Sha Tsui Properties; Sino Land; Sino Group; Sino Hotels; Former member of the board of Yeo Hiap Seng Limited Yeo Hiap Seng

Member of the 10th Sichuan Committee of the Chinese People's Political Consultative Conference
- In office 2003–2008

Member of the 12th and 13th Beijing Committees of the Chinese People's Political Consultative Conference
- Incumbent
- Assumed office 2013

Member of Hong Kong Election Committee
- Incumbent
- Assumed office 2017

Chinese name
- Traditional Chinese: 黃永光
- Simplified Chinese: 黄永光
Transcriptions
Standard Mandarin
- Hanyu Pinyin: Huáng Yǒng Guāng
Yue: Cantonese
- Jyutping: Wong^{4} Wing^{5} Gwong^{1}

Daryl Ng Win-kong, SBS, JP (born in 1978), is a Singaporean businessman and company director based in Hong Kong. He is chairman of Sino Group, which comprises three publicly listed companies — Sino Land, Sino Hotels, and Tsim Sha Tsui Properties, as well as several privately held entities.

== Early life and education ==
Ng was born at Queen Mary Hospital in Hong Kong. From his father's side, he is the grandchild of Ng Teng Fong, the founder of Sino Group. He is also the grandchild of Yeoh Ghim Seng from his mother's side. Ng attended the Diocesan Boys' School in his youth. He later studied in the United States, and graduated from Columbia University in 2001.

== Business career ==
After graduation from university, Ng joined Sino Group, founded by his late grandfather, as a project manager. He was later appointed as an executive director in 2005.

In addition to day-to-day operations of Sino Group, Ng took charge of the Old Tai O Police Station project, which was converted into a nine-room boutique hotel, Tai O Heritage Hotel under Batch I of the Revitalising Historic Buildings Through Partnership Scheme of the Development Bureau. He told The New York Times that he hoped the project “..achieves three aspects: to allow visitors to experience the delights and charms of a local Hong Kong village, to appreciate the heritage and history of Hong Kong, as well as eco-tourism.”

Ng is in-charge of the opening of The Fullerton Hotel Sydney, located in the former Sydney General Post Office building, a heritage-listed landmark in central Sydney.

He is also responsible for The Fullerton Heritage project (The Fullerton Hotel Singapore and associated buildings) in Singapore. The waterfront precinct comprises four historic buildings and three modern architecture; it has received a number of awards in heritage conservation and hospitality.

The HKSAR Government has awarded the Silver Bauhinia Star to him in recognition of his contributions to the community, in particular his work on heritage in Tai O and overseas.

In Hong Kong, he also oversees the development of The Fullerton Ocean Park Hotel Hong Kong, which opened doors in July 2022.

Ng was appointed chairman of Yeo Hiap Seng on 1 January 2020 and stepped down on 2 April 2025.

In August 2025, Ng was appointed Chairman of Sino Group, succeeding his father, Robert Ng.

== Political career ==
Ng served on the 12th, 13th and 14th Beijing Municipal Committees of the Chinese People's Political Consultative Conference; and currently serves on the Standing Committee of the 14th Beijing Municipal Committee. At the 10th Chinese People's Political Consultative Conference (2003 to 2008), he was a member of the Sichuan Committee.

Ng was one of the two deputy directors of Carrie Lam's 2017 Hong Kong Chief Executive election's campaign. He was also part of a three-member election campaign finance team for John Lee Ka-chiu's 2022 Hong Kong Chief Executive election campaign.

Ng is currently serving as a member of the Election Committee of Hong Kong for his second term since 2017.

== Community work ==
Ng is known as a keen supporter of good causes. He is seen in community services, green initiatives, heritage conservation, as well as arts and cultural events.

Since 2013, he has been serving on the Spirit of Hong Kong Awards judging panel, an award paying tribute to Hong Kong's unsung heroes who have made a positive impact on others.

Ng has also worked on social and green innovations, driving projects like purification of food waste filtrate with micro-algae, in-building hydropower system and the award-winning City Air Purification System in collaboration with universities and engineering consultant Arup. Under his leadership, innovations such as wind turbines, in-building hydropower systems have been installed in Sino Group projects like Park Metropolitan and The Avenue. He has spearheaded a programme to recycle and upcycle felled trees into compost, mulch, fences and furniture.

To further the efforts to drive innovation, he established the Hong Kong Innovation Foundation in 2018. Positioned as a holistic innovation eco-system, the foundation caters to primary school through to start-ups and technology companies. It comprises programme like Go Code, Crazy Circuit and Robot Maker to teach pupil coding, circuit and robotics; OC STEM Lab to provide STEM activities and exposure for students and their parents; Hong Kong Science Fair to showcase children's technological and scientific creations; university entrepreneurship competitions with the University of Hong Kong (DreamCatchers), the Hong Kong University of Science and Technology (HKUST-One Million Dollar Entrepreneurship Competition) and Sino Inno Lab to provide a sandbox platform for start-ups and technology companies to test out inventions and fine-tune with market feedback.

== Public services ==
Ng also serves on the board of some public organisations, such as the Board of the Palace Museum of the West Kowloon Cultural District, Hong Kong. The board is responsible for formulating the vision and mission, as well as the strategies, policies and guidelines in relation to museological matters and professional standards of operations for the museum. He has completed three terms as a member of the National Heritage Board, Singapore.

== Personal life ==
Ng has two younger brothers David Ng Win Loong and Alexander Ng Win Yew, both graduated from Columbia University.
