= Yeo Hiap Seng =

Singaporean beverage company

Yeo Hiap Seng Limited
- Type: Public company (SGX: Y03 ) Subsidiary of Far East Organization
- Industry: Conglomerate
- Founded: 1900; 126 years ago
- Headquarters: Singapore
- Key people: Na Wu Beng, Chairman; Ong Yuh Hwang, Group CEO
- Products: Food and beverage, property
- Revenue: ▼SG$321.868 Million (Fiscal Year Ended 31 December 2020)
- Operating income: ▼SG$91.280 Million (Fiscal Year Ended 31 December 2020)
- Net income: ▼ –SG$10.032 Million (Fiscal Year Ended 31 December 2020)
- Total assets: ▼SG$682.749 Million (Fiscal Year Ended 31 December 2020)
- Total equity: ▼SG$588.162 Million (Fiscal Year Ended 31 December 2020)
- Owner: Far East Orchard (49.5% stake)
- Parent: Far East Organization
- Website: www.yeos.com.sg

Yeo Hiap Seng Limited (simplified Chinese: 杨协成; traditional Chinese: 楊協成; pinyin: Yáng Xiéchéng; Pe̍h-ōe-jī: Iûⁿ Hia̍p-sêng, Commonly known as Yeo's) is a Singaporean beverage company. It operates as an investment holding company as well as a drink manufacturer in Singapore, Malaysia and China. It is a multinational corporation that has offices and market presence in the US, Europe, Australia, New Zealand, Maldives, Mauritius, Mongolia, Pacific Islands, Mainland China, Hong Kong, Cambodia, Myanmar, Laos and Vietnam. Some of its house brands (See Below) include H-Two-O, Yeo's Asian Beverages, Justea, and Pink Dolphin.

YHS majority shareholder is Ng Teng Fong's Far East Organization, which also develops houses and condominiums. The company also has operations in over 60 countries which includes Thailand, China, Singapore, Malaysia, United States and franchises in Indonesia and Mauritius.

== History ==
=== Establishment ===
The company's history dates back to 1900. Founded by Yeo Keng Lian (Chinese: 杨景连), a native of Fujian, China, who began his business career by making soy sauce in Zhangzhou with the Yeo Hiap Seng Sauce Factory (Chinese: 杨协成) in 1901. Then he immigrated to Singapore in the 1930s, where he re-established the Yeo Hiap Seng Sauce Factory in 1938. Yeo died in Singapore in 1960.

The name Yeo Hiap Seng is of Christian origin, with Hiap Seng meaning unity of Christ as Yeo was Presbyterian.

=== Corporate ===
Although founded in 1938, the company was incorporated in Singapore on 20 December 1955 as Yeo Hiap Seng Canning and Sauce Factory Private Limited and was listed on the Singapore Exchange in 1969 and renamed to its present shorter name.

The 1950s saw the company can curry chicken, pioneer the bottling of soy milk, and package Asian drinks in Tetra Brik aseptic containers using the Ultra-high temperature processing system.

=== 1990s and beyond ===
In June 1995, Robert Ng took over as chairman of Yeo Hiap Seng (YHS). His chairmanship came at the same time as his family increased its stake in the company to 24.9%, just short of the 25% threshold above which they would be required by law to make an offer to buy out all other shareholders. This marked a step forward in his fight with Malaysian billionaire investor Quek Leng Chan for control of YHS and its land holdings in Singapore's Bukit Timah district, which could be worth billions of dollars were they redeveloped into residential real estate. In the end, Ng and his father were able to successfully take advantage of squabbles within the Yeo family to buy up 86% of YHS' stock. Their battle to gain control of the company was later described as "one of the most colourful take-over struggles in Singapore's history" and led to YHS' transformation from a food company to a luxury real estate developer.

== See also ==
- List of food companies
- Vitasoy – Hong Kong–based soy beverage giant

== Bibliography ==
- Backman, Michael (2001), Asian eclipse: exposing the dark side of business in Asia, J. Wiley, ISBN 978-0-471-47912-3
