= Ng Teng Fong =

Singaporean businessman (1928–2010)

- 黄廷方
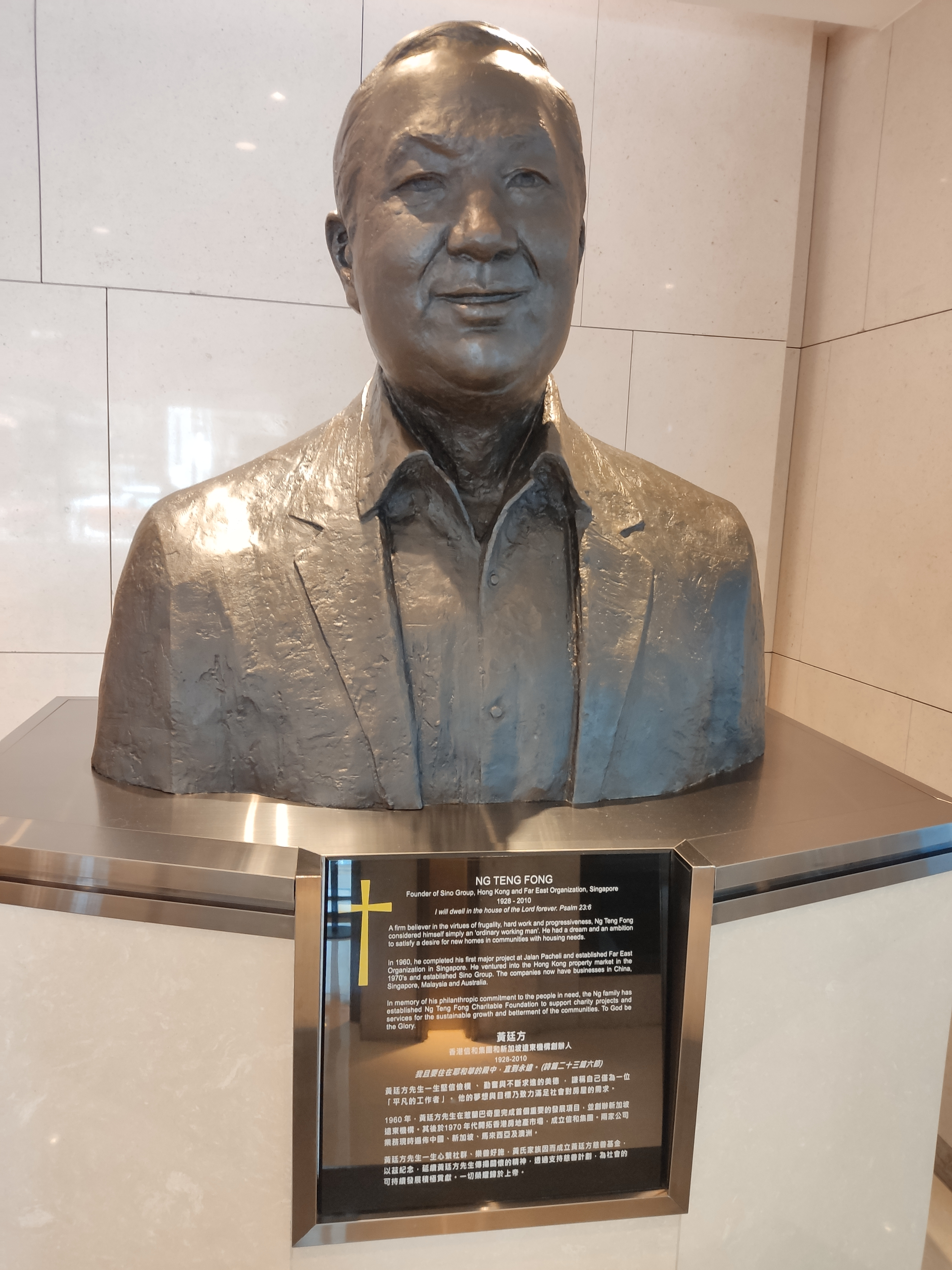
- Sculpture dedicated to Ng Teng Fong at the Shai Tsui centre
- Born: 黄廷方; 28 July 1928; Putian, Fujian, Republic of China
- Died: 2 February 2010 (aged 81); Singapore
- Occupation: Businessman
- Title: Founder of Far East Organization
- Spouse: Tan Kim Choo
- Children: 5, including Robert and Philip
- Relatives: Daryl Ng (grandson); Ng Eng Hen (nephew)

Ng Teng Fong (黄廷方, Báⁿ-uā-ci̍: Ńg Déng-ho̤ng; 28 July 1928 – 2 February 2010) was a Singaporean real estate tycoon with a major presence in Hong Kong. He is the father of Robert Ng. In 1997, Forbes listed the two as the 30th richest people in the world.

== History ==
Ng Teng Fong was born in a small village in Putian, Fujian, China. The eldest of 11 children, he moved to Singapore with his family when he was six.

Having little formal education, Ng worked at his parents’ soy sauce factory and as a bicycle repairman in his younger days. He started his first business with a provision shop and subsequently found his niche in the business of property development. Ng managed to raise enough capital to establish Far East Organization (FEO) around 1960.

FEO’s first residential development project was Jalan Pacheli in Serangoon Gardens which was completed in 1962. Ng expanded into the hotel industry with the Singapura Forum Hotel and Hilton Singapore Hotel on Orchard Road and other residential developments at Katong and Watten Estate. By the 1980s, he was the largest private landowner and developer in the country. His influence on Singapore's prime retail property, including the development of malls such as Far East Plaza and Lucky Plaza gave him the moniker "King of Orchard Road". He ventured into the Hong Kong property markets in the 1970s.

Ng's family owns the development corporations Far East Organization and Sino Group. Far East Organization was established as an umbrella for Ng's Singapore-based companies, which include Far East Hospitality, Far East Orchard, and Yeo Hiap Seng. Hong Kong-based Sino Group is a sister group to the FEO. The group oversees 180 privately held developments and investment companies and two publicly listed companies. Far East Organization is Singapore’s largest private property developer, and Sino Group is a major player in Hong Kong’s property market.

Despite Ng Teng Fong's vast fortune, he had a reputation for leading a frugal and miserly lifestyle. Though he controlled at least a quarter of Singapore's housing market, Ng lived in the same house he'd had for 30 years, and used to take his own lunch on airplanes.

Ng suffered a cerebral hemorrhage on 23 January 2010 and, after an unsuccessful operation, died on 2 February 2010 at the age of 82. At his death, he was reportedly the richest person in Singapore.

At the time of his death, Sino Group was one of Hong Kong's largest real estate developers, and Far East Organization remained one of the largest landholders in Singapore. Far East Organization also owns The Fullerton Singapore and numerous other landmark hotels and other properties.

His family donated $125 million in 2011 for the building of a Singaporean hospital in Jurong East and the Ng Teng Fong General Hospital was subsequently named after the late property tycoon. Following a S$52 million donation in 2014 to Tan Tock Seng Hospital, the adjacent Centre for Healthcare Innovation was also named after him.

== Personal life ==
Ng was married to Tan Kim Choo and had seven children. His eldest son, Robert Ng Chee Siong oversees the Sino Group in Hong Kong with his son Daryl. Ng's younger son, Philip Ng Chee Tat is the chief executive of Far East Organization since 1991 and served as Singapore's Non-Resident Ambassador to Chile and Argentina.

Robert and Philip's combined family net worth was estimated to be US$9.7 billion in 2017. The family's wealth is held through Sino Group and Far East Organization.
