= Smart Alliance =

Organization of Southeast Asian TV broadcasters

- Abbreviation: SA
- Formation: 24 March 2009; 17 years ago
- Type: TV Alliance
- Purpose: Collaborate on content, sales and marketing, and technology in television
- Headquarters: Singapore
- Region served: Southeast Asia
- Members: ABS-CBN Corporation (Philippines); BBTV 7 (Thailand); International Media Corporation (Vietnam); Mediacorp (Singapore); Media Nusantara Citra (Indonesia); Media Prima (Malaysia)
- Official language: English and primary Southeast Asian languages
- Chairman of the Steering Committee: Lucas Chow
- Main organ: Steering Committee
- Parent organization: ASEAN
- Website: http://smartalliancemedia.com/

Smart Alliance is an alliance of six Southeast Asian television broadcasting companies established in 2009. The companies in the alliance are the Philippines' ABS-CBN Corporation, Thailand's BBTV 7, Vietnam's International Media Corporation, Singapore's Mediacorp, Indonesia's Media Nusantara Citra, and Malaysia's Media Prima.

== History ==
On 24 March 2009, six Southeast Asian television broadcasting companies allied to cooperate in three areas—content, sales and marketing, and technology—and capitalize on the economies of scale and combined market that the region can offer. They signed a memorandum of understanding to form the Smart Alliance.

As a region, member countries of the Association of Southeast Asian Nations (ASEAN) alone present a combined market size of more than half a billion viewers and a growing middle-class population with increasingly substantial spending powers. The alliance is well positioned to exploit economies of scale both as a supplier of coveted content and as a buyer of technology and equipment. For advertisers and clients, the alliance will be able to deliver marketing and promotional solutions on a regional platform.

In March 2010, in celebration of the alliance's first year, Smart Alliance members gathered in Manila, Philippines to formally sign an Equipment and Facilities Lease Agreement, which aims to share facilities among member companies to reduce operating and equipment costs, and an agreement on a website that aims to create an online portal that will provide information about the alliance to various stakeholders. Although not part of their original agenda, the group also signed an agreement formalizing a joint sales package launched by the group according to their goal of boosting regional revenue through jointly led strategies and new target markets to enable the alliance to gain a competitive advantage sustainably

== Members ==
- (Philippines) ABS-CBN Corporation
- (Thailand) Bangkok Broadcasting & Television Company Limited Channel 7
- (Vietnam) International Media Corporation (including TodayTV, YouTV, etc.)
- (Singapore) Mediacorp
- (Indonesia) Media Nusantara Citra
- (Malaysia) Media Prima

== Key people ==
=== Steering Committee ===
- Chairman
  - Lucas Chow
- Members
  - Eugenio Lopez III
  - Khun Veraphan
  - Tim Lam
  - Abdul Rahman Ahmad
  - Hary Tanoesoedibjo
  - Chang Long Jong

=== Content Work Group ===
- Leader
  - Doreen Neo
- Members
  - Linggit Tan
  - Sharon Loh
  - Farisha Pawanteh
  - Rudy Ramawy

=== Sales & Marketing Work Group ===
- Leader
  - Irene Lim
- Members
  - Luis Paolo Pineda
  - Sapna Angural
  - Shareen Ooi
  - Kanti Imansyah

=== Technology Work Group ===
- Leader
  - Yeo Kim Pow
- Members
  - Raul Bulaong
  - Tan Kwong Meng
  - Agus Mulyanto
