= Bie Tingfang =

Chinese National Revolutionary Army general (1883–1940)

- 别廷芳
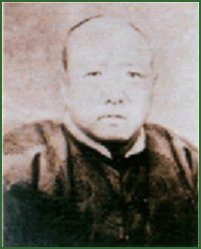
- Born: 1883
- Died: 1940 (aged 56–57)
- Military career
- Allegiance: Republic of China
- Rank: Lieutenant-General

Bie Tingfang (Chinese: 别廷芳; Pinyin: Bié Tíngfāng; 1883–1940) was a Lieutenant-General in the National Revolutionary Army of China.

== Biography ==
Bie was born into a poor peasantry family in Neixiang County, Nanyang, Henan in 1883. After numerous persecutions by the local landlords, Bie was forced into joining one of the gangs of bandits. Unlike other bandits, Bie Tingfang had a great ambition and used this opportunity to his advantage by becoming a local Robin Hood for the poor. At the same time, Bie Tingfang also realized that in order to dominate the region, he must obtain the support of local landlords as well. Luckily, the most powerful landlords were not at good terms with those less powerful landlords who persecuted Bie, so Bie carefully cultivated his good relationships with the largest local warlords by orchestrating a ghost event.

The largest local landlord Zhou had a serious family problem: his fourth concubine committed suicide by hanging herself because she could not take Zhou's wife's pressure. Bie Tingfang ordered his followers to hide outside the windows of the rooms of Zhou's residence, faking the crying of the dead concubine, which threatened the wife, who was directly responsible for the concubine's death. Zhou's wife obviously had nerve break-down and Zhou was desperate to find a solution. Bie Tingfang offered his service to rid of the fourth concubine's ghost from Zhou's residence, and after an elaborate ceremony, Bie Tingfang begun his so-called supernatural services by acting alone, while others were only too happy to oblige. Bie Tingfang entered the room in which the fourth concubine hanged herself and then the wife's bedroom, and soon reappeared, claiming the ghost was destroyed for good. The ghostly crying of the fourth concubine stopped the very same night (Of course, Bie had simply ordered his followers to stop).

The most powerful landlord was of course grateful and promised Bie anything he wanted. Bie took this advantage by asking financial support to purchase repeating rifles, getting legitimacy by becoming the local security force, and making peace with those less powerful landlords who previously persecuted him. As a result, Bie Tingfang managed to turn his former enemy into allies while making more powerful friends, and due to his highly disciplined troops, he also maintained his peasantry support by eliminate other bandits who robbed the poor. From this humble beginning, Bie eventually developed into and remained a powerful warlord in Henan by switching to different sides between Feng Yuxiang and Chiang Kai-shek.

Bie Tingfang was able to maintain his control in Henan regardless of his Kuomintang superiors because he was a capable and ardent anti-communist. Bie was instrumental in defeating Zhang Guotao and completely wiping out Zhang's communist base in Henan, forcing Zhang to fled to Sichuan and establish new base there. For his successful anti-communist campaigns, neither Feng Yuxiang nor Chiang Kai-shek would want to replace him because they would rather have a warlord they could bribe instead of communists. Furthermore, before the total defeat of Guominjun, both sides needed Bie's support or at least, neutrality in their fights.

During the Second Sino-Japanese War, he was Commandant of the Self-Defence Army (militia) in the Henan 6th District from 1938 to 1939. Chiang Kai-shek had become Bie's last boss and planned to remove him after completely defeating Feng Yuxiang. However, Bie successfully resisted this; his force readily and soundly defeated Chiang Kai-shek's force, and its commander, Tang Enbo was forced to disguise as an army cook to escape from Henan in order to evade capture. Following the Japanese success in the Battle of Wuhan and Battle of Suixian-Zaoyang he became a guerrilla commandant in the Hubei-Henan-Anhui border area until he died of disease in 1940. In his last years, Bie Tingfang made a drastic turn in his political preference by cooperating with communists to fight the Japanese invaders, thus becoming an ally or at least, a sympathizer of communists from the original ardent anti-communist.
