= Sino Group =

Property company in Hong Kong

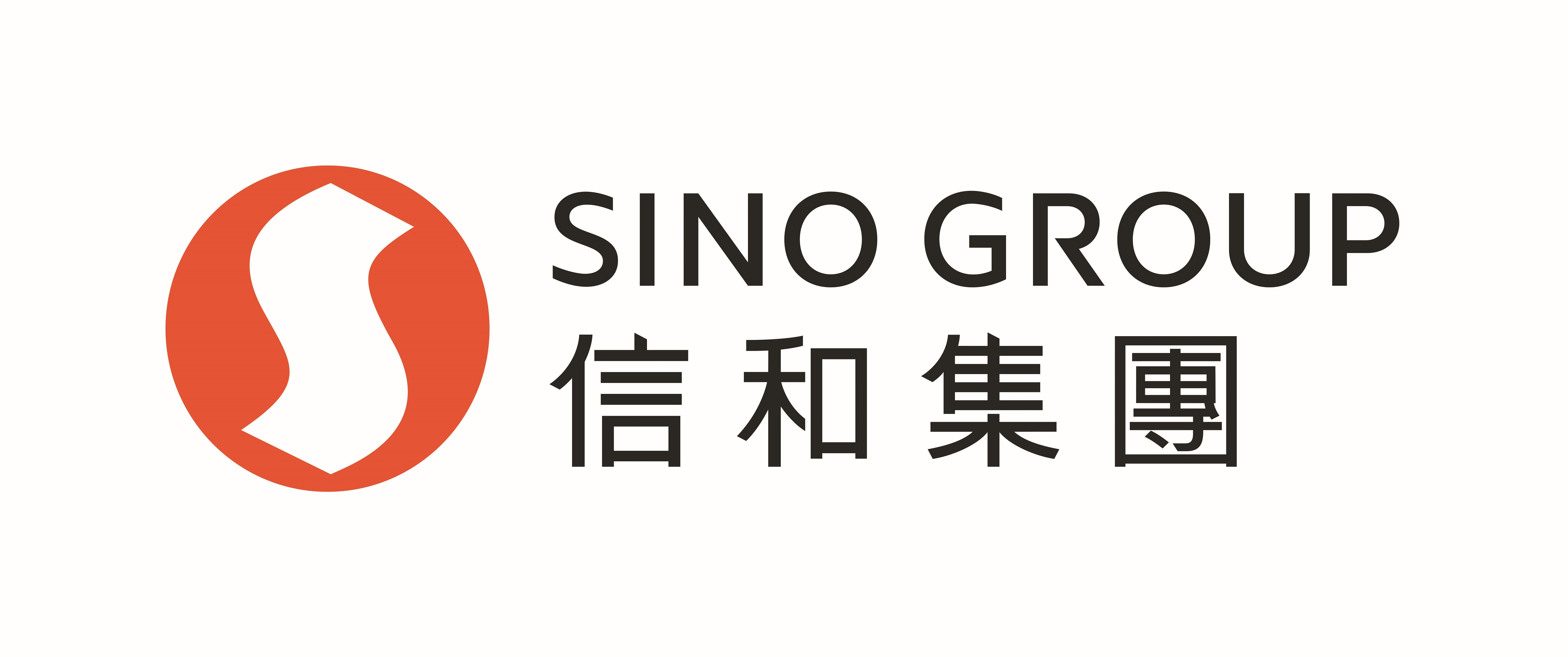

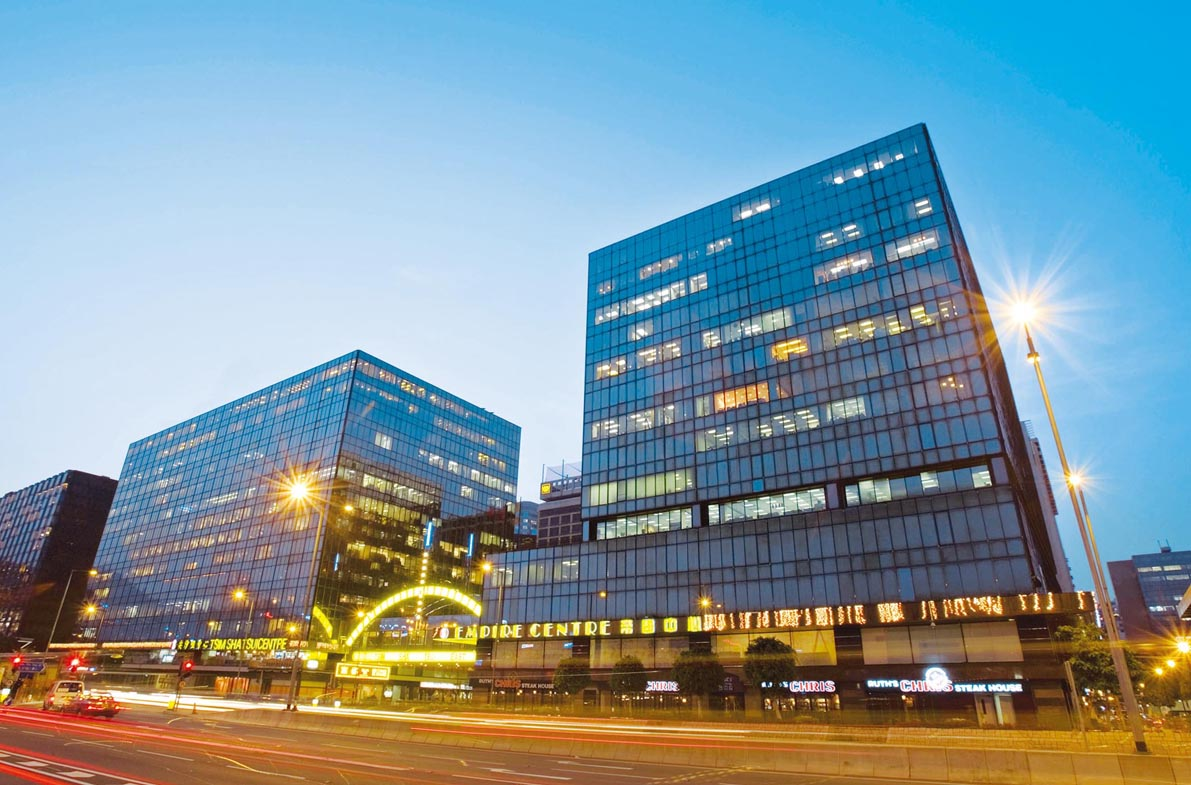
- Headquarters at Tsim Sha Tsui Center
- Native name: 信和集團
- Industry: Property
- Founded: 1971
- Founder: Ng Teng Fong
- Headquarters: Hong Kong
- Area served: Hong Kong, Mainland China, Singapore, Australia
- Key people: Robert Ng; Daryl Ng
- Number of employees: Over 11,000
- Website: sino.com

Sino Group (Chinese: 信和集團) is a Hong Kong-based conglomerate established in 1971. It comprises three listed companies – Sino Land Company Limited (Note: SEHK: 83), Tsim Sha Tsui Properties Limited (Note: SEHK: 247), Sino Hotels (Holdings) Limited (Note: SEHK: 1221) – and private companies held by the Ng Family.

The Group's business interests comprise a residential, office, industrial, retail and hospitality properties across Hong Kong, mainland China, Singapore and Australia, and has developed over 250 projects, spanning more than 130 million square feet. It also provides services in property management, hotel investment and management, including The Fullerton Hotels & Resorts and other affiliate brands.

== History ==
On 5 January 1971, Sino Land Company Limited was incorporated in Hong Kong. Tsim Sha Tsui Properties Limited, a holding company of Sino Land Company Limited, was publicly listed in the Hong Kong Stock Exchange in 1972. In 1981, Sino Land Company Limited was publicly listed in the HKSE; it spun off its hospitality business interests to create the publicly listed Sino Hotels (Holdings) Limited in the HKSE in 1995.

== Governance ==
=== Chairman ===
1. Ng Teng Fong (1970–1991); founder
2. Robert Ng Chee Siong (1991–2025); son of Ng Teng Fong
3. Daryl Ng Win Kong (2025– ); son of Robert Ng

=== Deputy Chairman ===
1. Daryl Ng Win Kong (2017–2025); son of Robert Ng

== Listed companies ==
=== Sino Land Company Limited ===
Sino Land's core business comprises the development of and investment in residential, office, industrial and retail properties and hotels in Mainland China, Hong Kong, Singapore and Australia. Its business is complemented by property management, security, car park operations and environmental services.

In June 2024, Sino Land Company Limited was among ten companies to receive the (Building and Construction Information) BCI Asia Top 10 Developers Award.

=== Tsim Sha Tsui Properties Limited ===
Tsim Sha Tsui Properties is the holding company of Sino Land. The operations under Sino Land represent a substantial portion of the operations of TST Properties as a whole.

=== Sino Hotels (Holdings) Limited ===
The collection of properties offers 2,700 guest rooms and suites across 7 hotels including Conrad Hong Kong, Royal Pacific Hotel, City Garden Hotel, Island Pacific Hotel, Hong Kong Gold Coast Hotel, The Pottinger Hong Kong and The Olympian Hong Kong. The Gold Coast Yacht & Country Club also comes under the Sino Hotels portfolio.

Sino Group also owns and manages The Fullerton Hotels and Resorts, comprising four hotel properties, namely The Fullerton Hotel Singapore, The Fullerton Bay Hotel Singapore, The Fullerton Hotel Sydney, The Fullerton Ocean Park Hotel Hong Kong which opened in 2022, as well as the 1.4 million square feet Fullerton Heritage lifestyle precinct in Singapore.

== See also ==
- Far East Organization, Singapore-based real estate developer also owned by Ng family
- Tsim Sha Tsui Centre and Empire Centre
