= The Fullerton Hotel Singapore =

Hotel in Singapore

Coordinates: 1°17′10″N 103°51′11″E

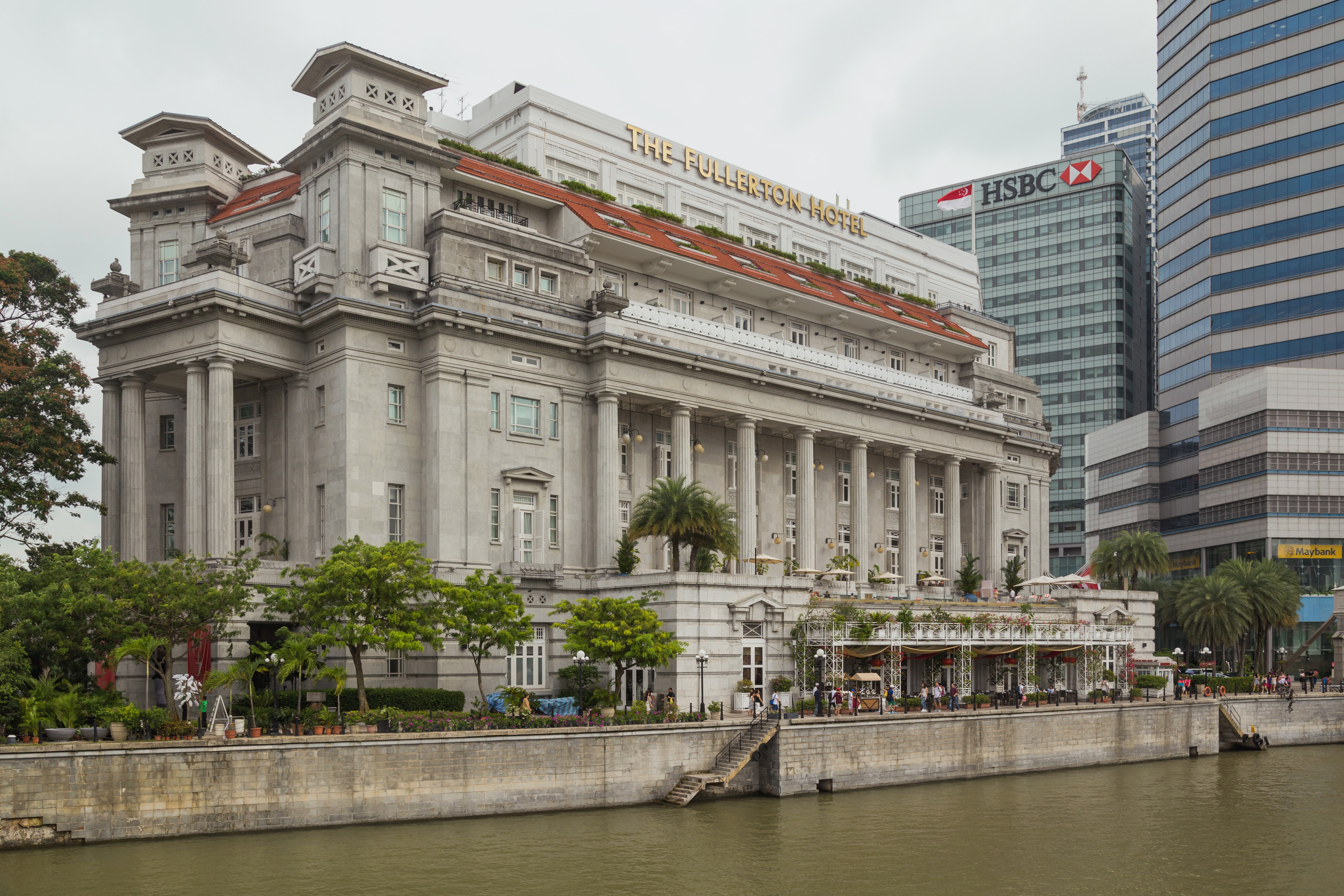

- Location within Singapore
- Former names: General Post Office Building
- Alternative names: Fullerton Building

General information
- Status: commercial
- Type: Hotel
- Architectural style: Neo classical
- Classification: R
- Location: Downtown Core Singapore, 1 Fullerton Square, Singapore 049178, Singapore
- Current tenants: General Post Office (former); Singapore Club (former); The Exchange (former); Marine Department (former); Import and Export Department (former)
- Named for: Robert Fullerton
- Construction started: February 1924; 102 years ago
- Completed: June 1928; 98 years ago
- Opened: 27 June 1928; 98 years ago
- Renovated: 1982, 1998-2000
- Owner: Precious Treasure Pte Ltd
- Landlord: Sino Land
- Affiliation: The Fullerton Heritage

Height
- Height: 37 m (121 ft)

Technical details
- Floor count: 9 (including 1 basement)
- Floor area: 41,100 sqm
- Lifts/elevators: 14

Design and construction
- Architect: Keys & Dowdeswell
- Developer: Far East Organization; Sino Land Company Limited
- Services engineer: Express Lift Company, Public Works Department
- Main contractor: Perry & Co. Overseas Ltd.

Renovating team
- Architect: Tay Lee Soon
- Renovating firm: Evelyn Houng Architects 61 Pte Ltd; DP Consultants
- Structural engineer: Oscar Faber Asia Pte Ltd
- Civil engineer: Oscar Faber Asia Pte Ltd
- Other designers: Hirsch Bedner Associates
- Main contractor: Dragages Singapore Pte Ltd

Other information
- Number of rooms: 400
- Number of restaurants: 3
- Number of bars: 2
- Parking: 350

Website
- fullertonhotels.com

National monument of Singapore
- Designated: 7 December 2015; 10 years ago
- Reference no.: 71
- Governing body: National Heritage Board

The Fullerton Hotel Singapore is a five-star luxury hotel located near the mouth of the Singapore River, in the Downtown Core of the Central Area, Singapore. It was originally known as the Fullerton Building, and also as the General Post Office Building. The address is 1 Fullerton Square. The Fullerton Building was named after Robert Fullerton, the first Governor of the Straits Settlements (1826–1829). Commissioned in 1924 as part of the British colony's centennial celebrations, the building was designed as an office building by Major P.H. Keys of Keys & Dowdeswell, a Shanghai firm of architects, which won the project through an architectural design competition. The architectural firm also designed the Capitol Theatre, its adjoined Capitol Building and the Singapore General Hospital. In 2015, it was designated as a national monument of Singapore.

== History ==
=== Fort Fullerton and the Singapore Stone ===
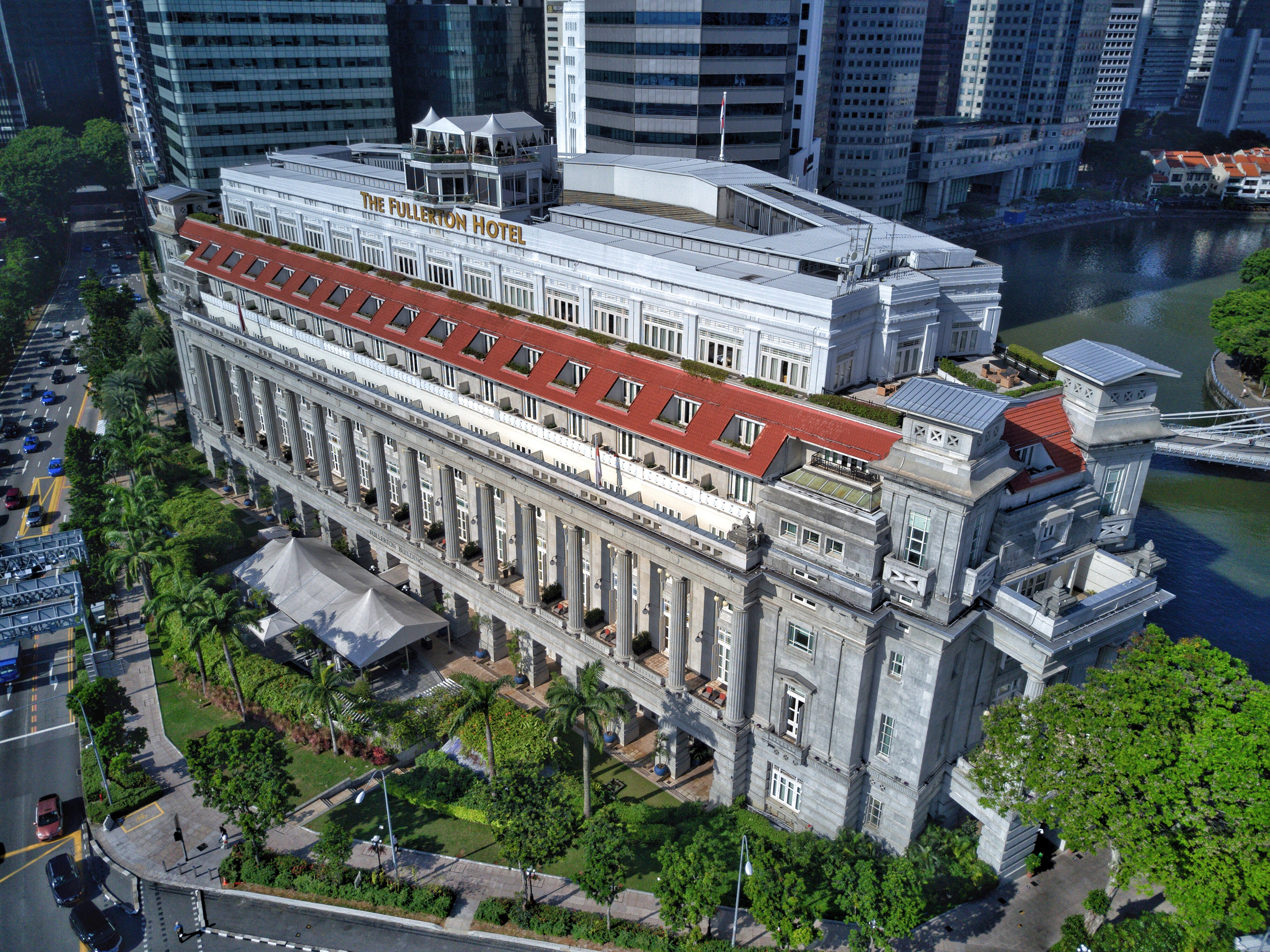
Aerial view of Fullerton Hotel, Singapore (pictured October 2018)

The northern end of the building covers the site of Fort Fullerton, a fort built in 1829 to defend the settlement against any naval attacks. The fort consisted of an Artillery Barrack, a house for the officers, barracks for soldiers, and a 68-pounder gun guarding the entrance to the river, which used to stand on the location known as Fullerton Square.

In 1843, the fort was extended after a sandstone monolith, the Singapore Stone, with an inscription possibly dating back to the 13th century was demolished. The Singapore stone was, unfortunately, destroyed by the British. A fragment of this monolith was salvaged and preserved in the collection of the National Museum at Stamford Road.

However, there were several criticisms and apprehensions regarding the building of Fort Fullerton. Merchants felt that using the prime location of the city for military purposes instead of trade would have prevented Singapore from generating more revenue and boosting its trading business. They were also worried about being in the direct line of fire if there were any attacks on the fort, because the offices along the Singapore River were situated in proximity to the fort. It was also said to be incapable of deterring any potential attacks from the sea, and had very low efficacy.

Following these criticisms, the fort was finally demolished in 1873, giving way to the first General Post Office and the Exchange Building in 1874 and 1879, respectively. Plans to erect the Fullerton Building were drawn up in 1920. However, due to a lack of funds, construction only began in February 1924. During the initial groundwork, excavations revealed the gun casements of the old Fort Fullerton. In fact, the Fullerton Building was built over reclaimed land. Built at a cost of $4.1 million and after delays of a few months, the building was completed in June 1928.

The Fullerton Building was opened on 27 June 1928 by the Governor, Sir Hugh Clifford, who suggested the building be named after Robert Fullerton. The building had five founding tenants: the General Post Office, The Exchange, Singapore Club (now Singapore Town Club), the Marine Department, and the Import and Export Department (later the Ministry of Trade and Industry). It also housed the Chamber of Commerce, and various government departments dealing with agriculture, fisheries and forestry. One of the rooms in the Fullerton Building was where the late Finance Minister, Dr. Goh Keng Swee, wrote many of his budget speeches for Singapore. The building was designed to utilize natural ventilation, thus has four internal air-wells to cool the interiors.

Fullerton Square was an important commercial zone in Singapore attracting many European immigrants and soon became the core of major business activity. Many European businesses were set up at Fullerton Square together with large banks such as the Chartered Bank and HSBC. It also housed the Club for the Colonial Elite, an exclusive club that took up almost 7,000 square metres (75,000 sq ft) of the upper floors.

A lighthouse was built on the Fullerton Building. Called the Fullerton Light, the lighthouse was used to guide ships ashore and anchor along the piers. It was built to replace the Fort Canning Light, which was decommissioned in 1979 since it was gradually blocked because of the construction of more high-rise buildings in Singapore. The location of the previous lighthouse is now occupied by The Lighthouse Restaurant.

The location of the Fullerton Hotel was once referred to as "Mile Zero" before the introduction of the modern road system. All locations in Singapore were measured and stemmed from "Mile Zero".

=== General Post Office ===
The building was originally commissioned as the General Post Office (GPO). The GPO covered the two lower floors with postal halls, offices and sorting rooms. Large mail drops placed mail on a band conveyor in the basement to be taken up to the sorting room. All mail was sorted by hand. One of the most memorable features of the GPO was its curved service counter which was almost 90 metres (300 ft) long. The basement was linked to a 35 metres (115 ft) subway, also called the GPO tunnel, that ran underneath Fullerton Road to a pier. From there, a lift would bring bags of mail to the Master Attendant's Pier, for transferring onto ships. Special mail was sent to neighbouring countries via sea, thus requiring at least 2 months to reach United Kingdom.

Before postal workers were allowed to work, they had to pledge to uphold their integrity. As public servants, they were not allowed to leak any information on what went through them (including the origin of the mail). Everything at work was strictly confidential. People often sent money by post using envelopes without using registered mail due to the higher cost incurred. Thus, it was extremely important that postal workers were honest and did not steal any items that went through the mail. To reinforce the importance of confidentiality, the comptroller of the General Post Office would stand at the gallery above the sorting halls to observe all postal workers and ensure none of the letters or mail were opened while being sorted.

Fridays were designated as arrival dates for overseas mail from Britain. Postal workers had to work overtime with no extra pay, just to wait for the mail to arrive and then sort it. They were not entitled to any days off and had to work around the clock. They were also forbidden from personally separating local and overseas letters.

The General Post Office continues to hold the Santa Claus Main Office even today. During Christmas seasons in the past, the post office would be filled with letters from children directed to Santa Claus. These letters were then sent to the Salvation Army, who would reply the children on behalf of Santa Claus. Presently, these letters are forwarded to the Santa Claus Main Office which is situated in the Santa Claus Village in Finland.

=== Singapore Club ===
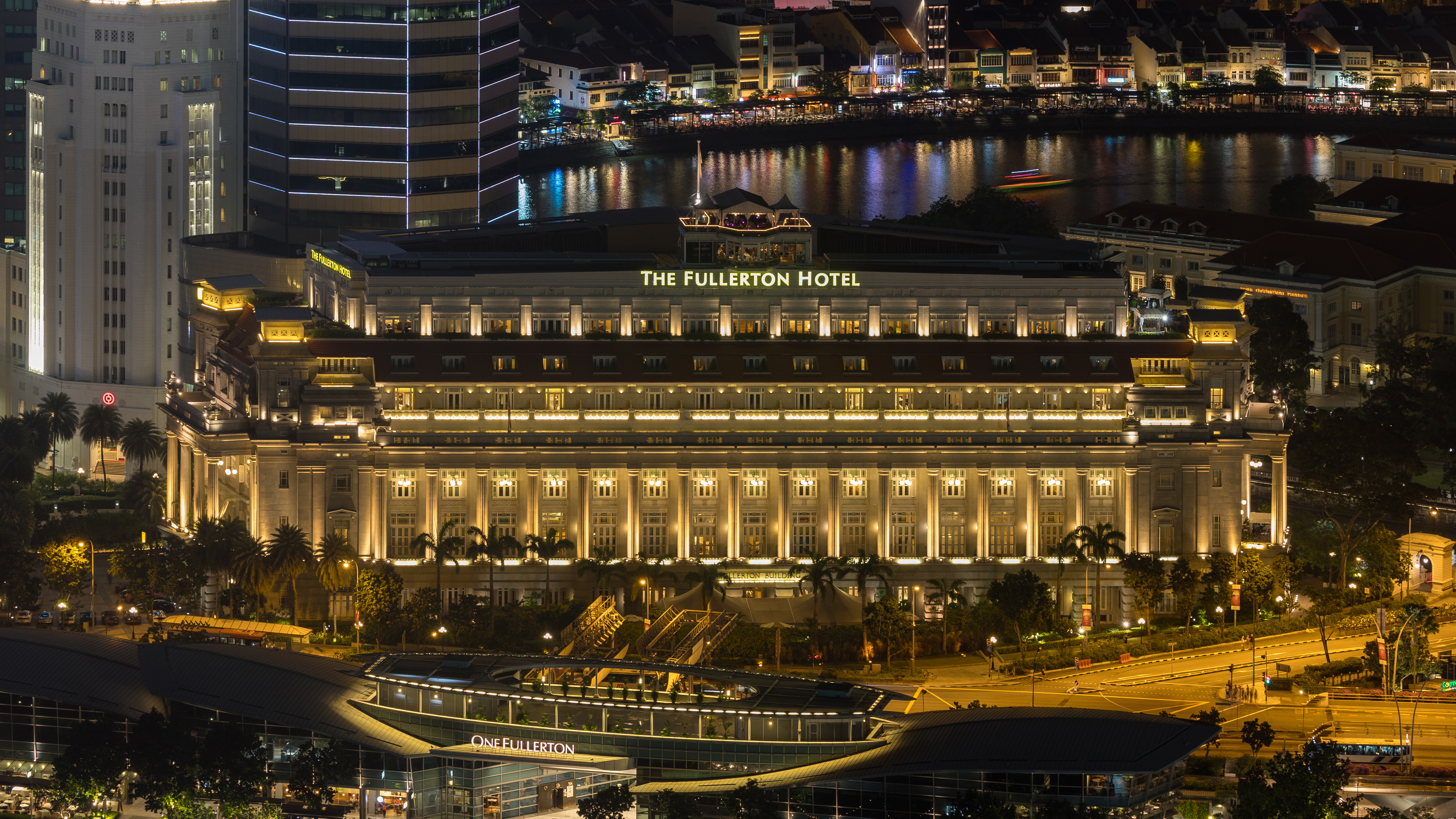
The Fullerton Hotel, seen from the Marina Bay Sands observation deck

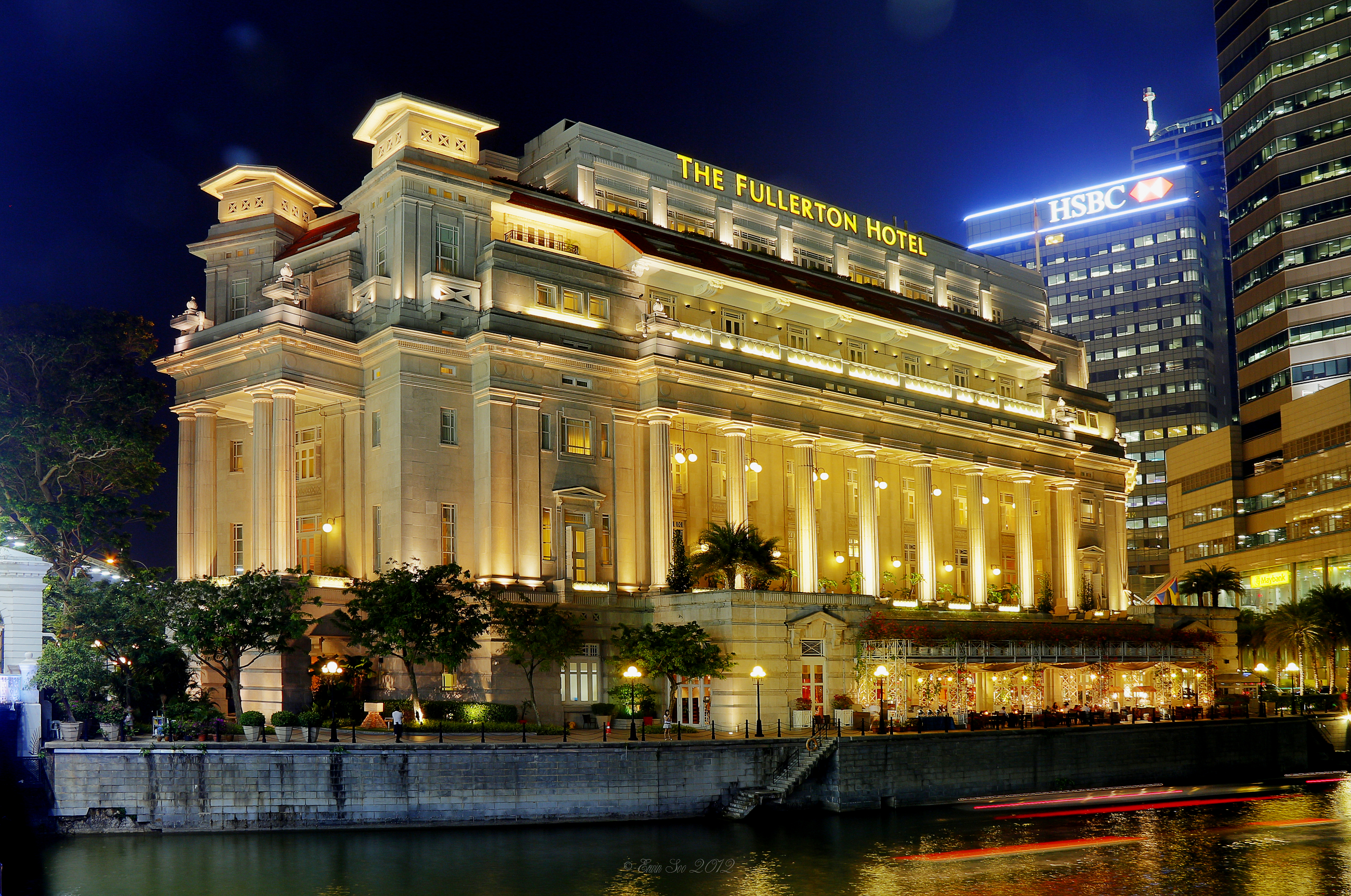
The Fullerton Hotel Singapore at night

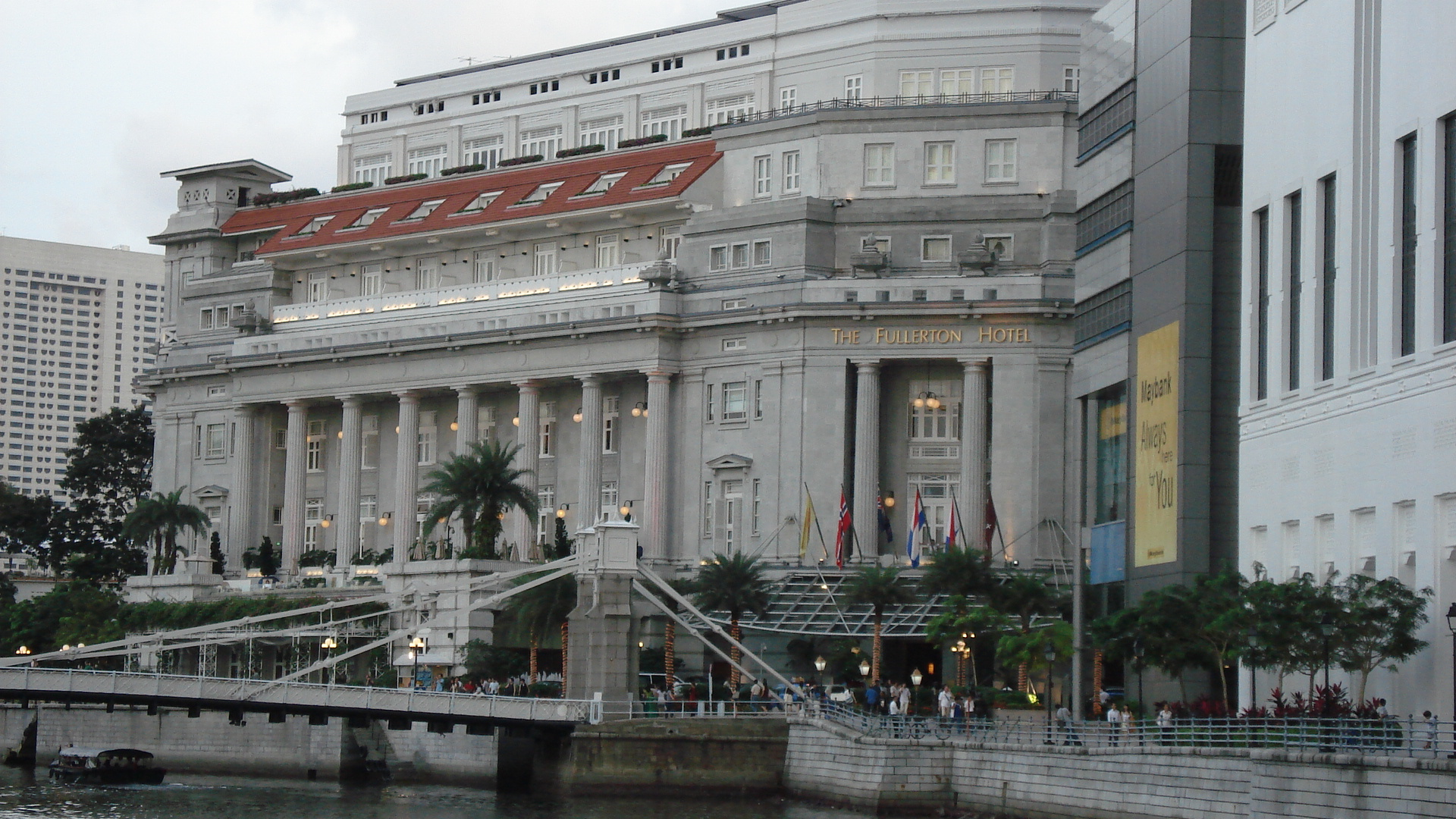
Fullerton Hotel at dusk. In front is the Cavenagh Bridge.

The exclusive Singapore Club rents premises on the upper floors of the building to provide for their members' need and comfort. It originally only allowed entry to European tycoons and British civil servants. There are rooms where members dined, lounged, conferred, and played billiards and cards. Bedrooms on the attic storey provided accommodation for members. When the Economic Development Board (EDB) was formed in 1961, it evicted the Singapore Club from the Fullerton Building. Subsequently, the Singapore Club relocated to Clifford House at Collyer Quay and then to Straits Trading Building on Battery Road near Boat Quay, vacating the Fullerton Building for use by the EDB and more government offices.

=== World War II ===
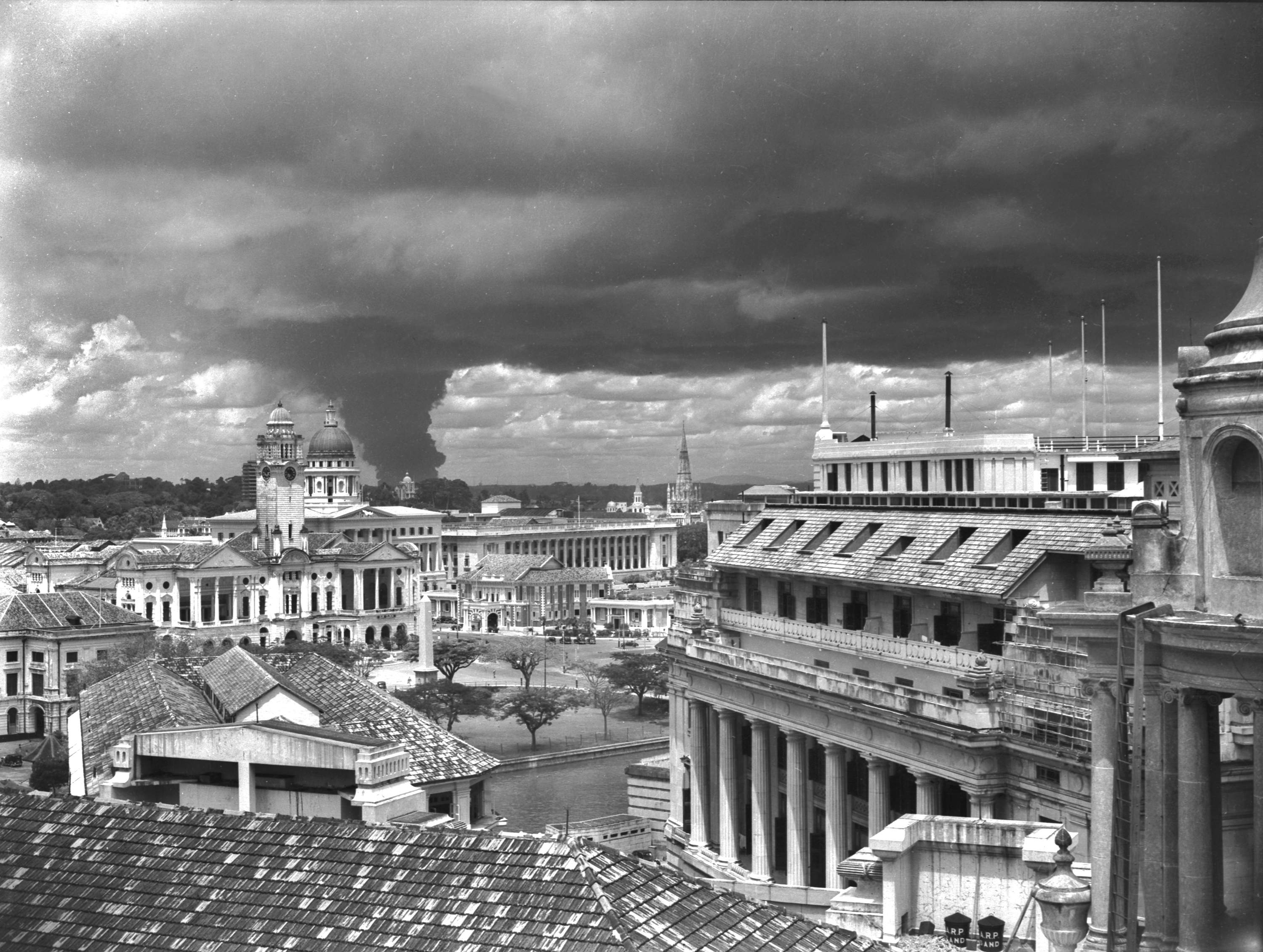
Fullerton Building (right) in January 1942, during the Japanese invasion

In the last days before Britain's surrender to Japan in 1942, the building was used as a hospital, with makeshift operation rooms for wounded British soldiers. During the Japanese Occupation of Singapore, Governor Sir Shenton Thomas and Lady Thomas sought refuge in the sleeping quarters of the Singapore Club. The Fullerton Building was also where General Percival discussed with Sir Shenton the possibility of surrendering Singapore to the Japanese. Subsequently, Fullerton Building became the headquarters of the Japanese military administration in Singapore.

=== Post-war years ===
In the 1950s, the Fullerton Building became recognised as an unofficial public monument. With its recognizable lighthouse, it stood out of the skyline as the most prominent feature of the waterfront. In time, the Fullerton became a symbol of Singapore, appearing in many postcards, recognised by travellers and ship captains from all over the world.

In 1965, Fullerton Square hosted a rally for Singapore's independence. Before the majestic background of the Fullerton Building, crowds declared their support for merdeka independence.

From the 1970s to 1995, the Inland Revenue Authority of Singapore used the building as its headquarters. Internal alterations were carried out on the building by the Public Works Department in 1985. The General Post Office, under Singapore Post, vacated the building in March 1996. Though plans were initiated to conserve the Fullerton Building after that, it was only gazetted as a conservation building by the Singapore Government in 1997.

=== Redevelopment ===
In 1997, Sino Land (Hong Kong) Company Ltd, a sister company of Far East Organization, acquired the Fullerton Building from the Urban Redevelopment Authority (URA). It spent close to another S$300 million converting Fullerton Building into a hotel and building the two-storey commercial complex One Fullerton opposite Fullerton Road. Renovation works on the Fullerton Building were completed on 8 December 2000. The Fullerton Hotel Singapore was officially opened by then Prime Minister Goh Chok Tong on 1 January 2001.

The site, sandwiched between the Civic District and the central business district, was sold together with an underpass and the seafront site on which One Fullerton now stands for S$110 million. The two are linked by an air-conditioned underground pedestrian walkway with travellators. To ensure that the historical Fullerton Building continues to be visible from Marina Bay, URA specified a low building height for One Fullerton across the road. This also ensured that guests at the Fullerton Hotel would have unobstructed views of the sea.

== Architecture and conservation ==
=== The Architect ===
Keys and Dowdeswell was an established British international architecture company, their design works can be seen in buildings throughout China and South East Asia from 1920s to 1940s, some of the most prominent buildings in Kuala Lumpur and Singapore were designed by them. Their design works are usually with major significance to a historical period, geographical place and local culture tradition, with many of their buildings in the classical style.

Major Keys & Dowdeswell were established and distinguished designers of grand interior spaces and classical façades. They followed the principals of 20th-century Beaux-Arts tradition of classicism. Relating to some of their core principals in design, they are largely Monumental and Ornamental.

=== Original design ===
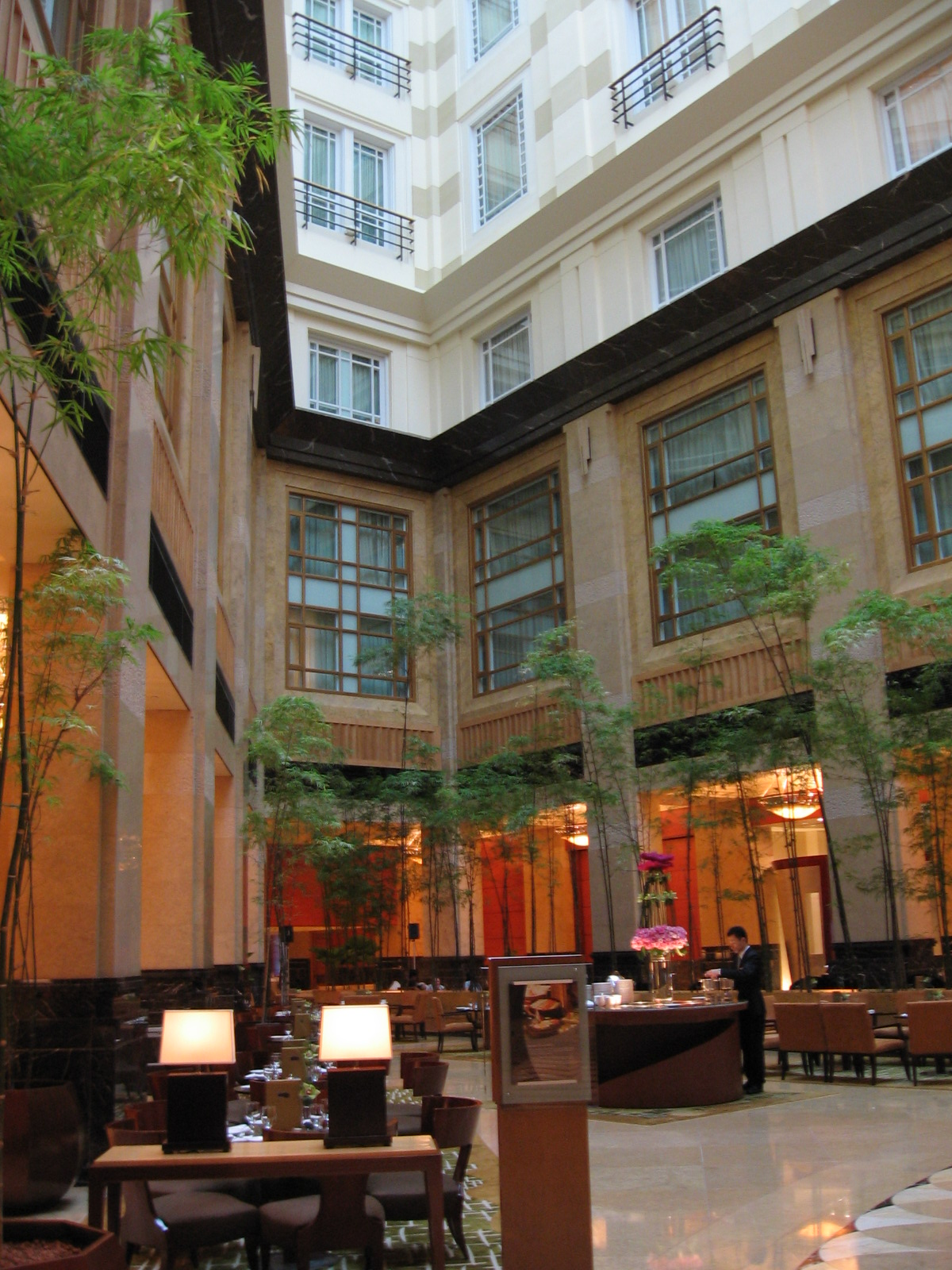
Atrium of The Fullerton Hotel Singapore

The grey Aberdeen granite Fullerton Building sits on 41,100 square metres (442,400 square feet) of land. The height of its walls measures 36.6 metres (120 ft) from the ground. The building has Neo-classical architectural features which include a two-storey fluted Doric colonnades on their heavy base, and the lofty portico over the main entrance with trophy designs and the Royal Coat of Arms, crafted by Italian Cavaliere Rudolfo Nolli. Originally, there were five distinct frontages, each treated in the Doric order. 14 elevators served the four floors plus the basement floors. A hollow cellular raft foundation was proposed by the original contractors in the 1920s to save cost because bedrock lies directly below the building. The Fullerton Building also possesses the one and only barrel-vaulted, coffered ceiling in Singapore.

=== Restoration ===
The Fullerton Building restoration project from 1998 to 2000 was a difficult conservation project that involved an institutional building. Architects 61, together with DP Consultants, was engaged to convert it into a 400-room luxury hotel. The hotel rooms were designed by Hirsch Bedner Associates.

During its redevelopment, the historical building had most of its exterior architectural features retained and restored. The conservation work was coordinated by the URA, which had certain stipulations that the new owners had to comply with. Several features of the original building had to be restored faithfully. These included the General Post Office gallery area on the ground floor, with bays that corresponded with the building's towering Doric columns on the façade, and the Straits Club Billiard Room. The post office gallery no longer exists, but has been subdivided to provide a bar, a restaurant and the hotel foyer. The Straits Club Billiard Room was kept, but without its wood panelling.

==== Exterior works ====
The building's neo-classical columns and high-ceiling verandas were retained. It was clad in Shanghai plaster panels, which have been restored. The owners converted the windows back to be housed in timber frames. Part of the tunnel under Fullerton Road, which was used to transfer mail onto ships waiting in the harbour, has also been kept.

==== Interior works ====
While the building's exterior has been conserved, the architects had also to transform the interior into a five-star hotel. The room on the fourth storey, where the British Governor was first told of the British military's decision to surrender to the Japanese during World War II, was converted to an exclusive lounge. The room has a barrel-vaulted, coffered ceiling, which is the only one of its kind in Singapore, and is the only surviving interior from the original building.

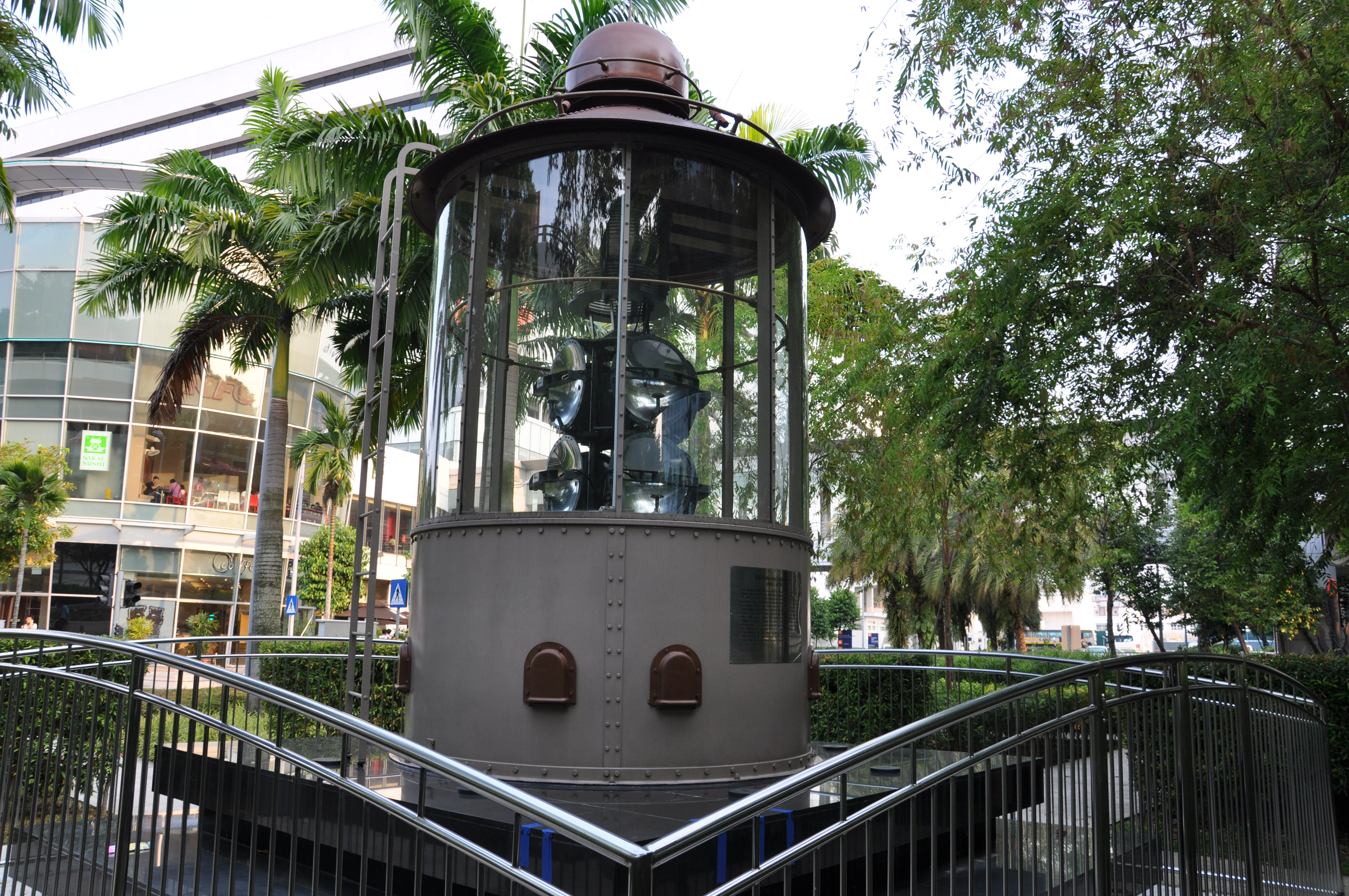
Fullerton Lighthouse at Harbour Front Tower

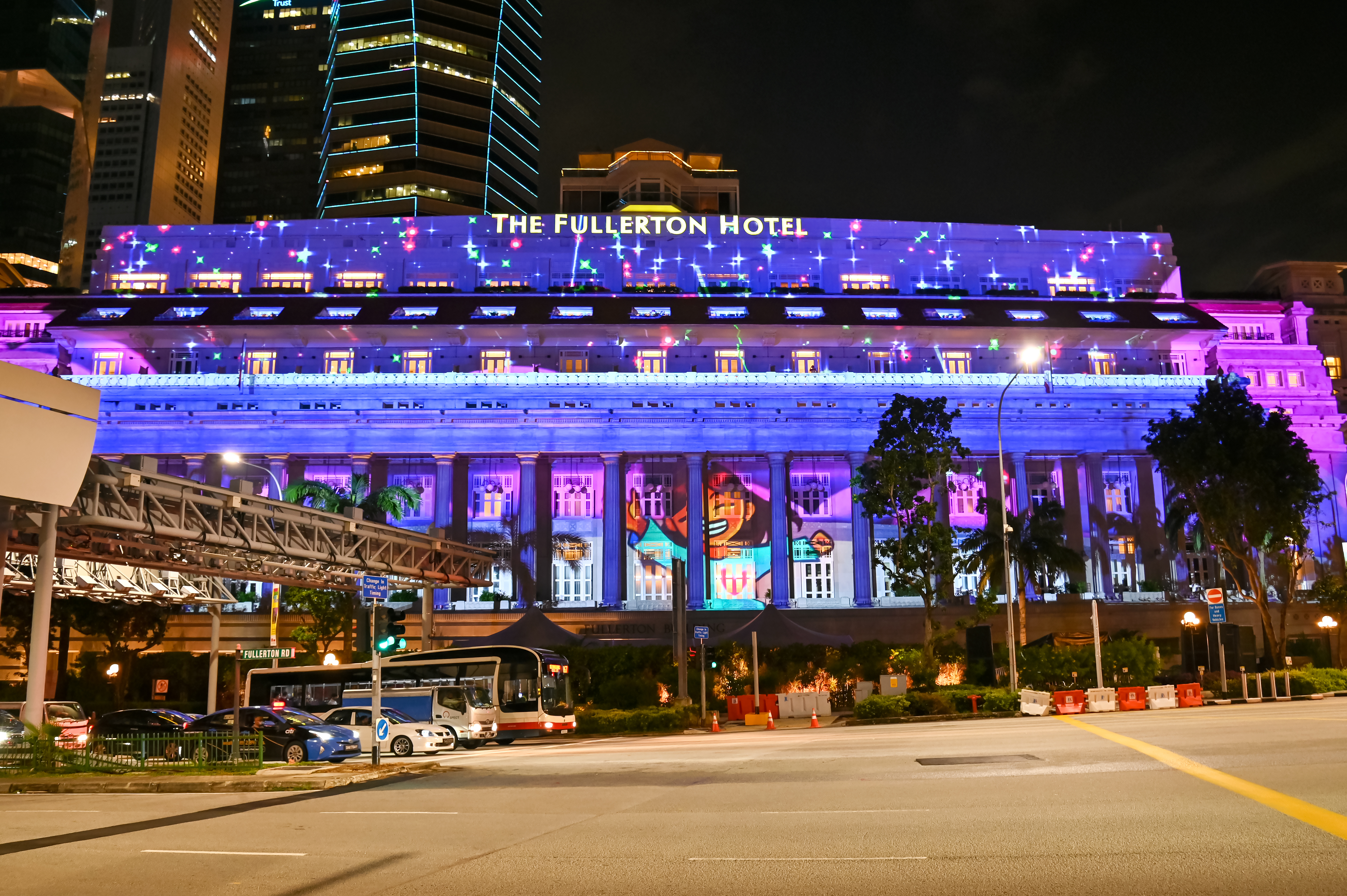
Facade Light Projection Show at the Fullerton Hotel Singapore in December 2021.

The building's historical lighthouse, which used to guide ships into the port, has been incorporated into a food and beverage outlet. The Fullerton Light, a revolving beacon of 540 kilocandelas mounted on the roof of the building, was installed in 1958 to replace the Fort Canning Lighthouse which was being demolished. The beacon could be seen by ships 29 kilometres (15.7 nautical miles) away. The Lighthouse has been moved to a new location as an artefact near Harbour Front Tower.

The Fullerton Building was designed for natural ventilation before the age of air-conditioning; one of the architectural devices used to provide this was the internal air-wells. There were four air-wells along the central longitudinal axis, divided by three internal bays of offices, linking the front façade with the rear. These no longer exist as most of the interior was demolished to create a single large atrium. It was the largest and the last example of this kind of architecture in Singapore. As air-conditioning became increasingly common, the air-wells became redundant.

Two parallel sets of guest rooms now ring the hotel's central triangular sky-lit atrium. One row faces out towards the harbour and the tall buildings of the central business district. The rooms of the inner ring have views of the courtyard in the centre of the building. There is an indoor garden over the old Straits Club at the centre of the atrium which can double as a venue for cocktails. The main entrance into the hotel, where dignitaries and celebrities are received, is covered with a large glass canopy at the porch.

==== Structural and foundation works ====
Construction work in the interior was carried out to reinforce the beams and columns, while retrofitting done on the exterior to restore the façade.

Although studies carried out before the renovation work began showed most of the raft foundation was still in good condition, water from the adjacent Singapore River had seeped slowly into some of the foundation's cells over the years, flooding parts of the old basement. As a result, a new precast concrete platform was built over the cells, and waterproofing added. Pillars supporting the entire building now rest on the platform. The engineering team installed a new set of five drainage pumps to counteract the slow seepage of river water. As the building sits on solid rock foundation, no additional piling was required.

==== Gazetting as National Monument ====
The building was officially gazetted on 7 December 2015, as Singapore's 71st national monument. The building will be preserved under the Preservation of Monuments Act.

== Facilities ==
The Fullerton Hotel Singapore has 400 rooms and suites which either overlook the atrium courtyard, or face downtown Singapore's skyline, the Singapore River promenade or the Marina Bay.

The hotel has a 25-metre outdoor infinity swimming pool, fitness centre and a luxury spa. It also has five food and beverage outlets. For business travellers, the hotel has a 24-hour internal business centre with the Bloomberg Professional service that provides financial reports and world news, and 15 meeting rooms equipped with conference facilities.

== Awards ==
The Fullerton Hotel Singapore won the Condé Nast Traveler Gold List award. On 18 July 2001, the hotel received an architectural heritage award from the Urban Redevelopment Authority for its successful restoration of the former Fullerton Building.
