= Capitol Centre, Singapore =

Building in Singapore

Capitol Centre
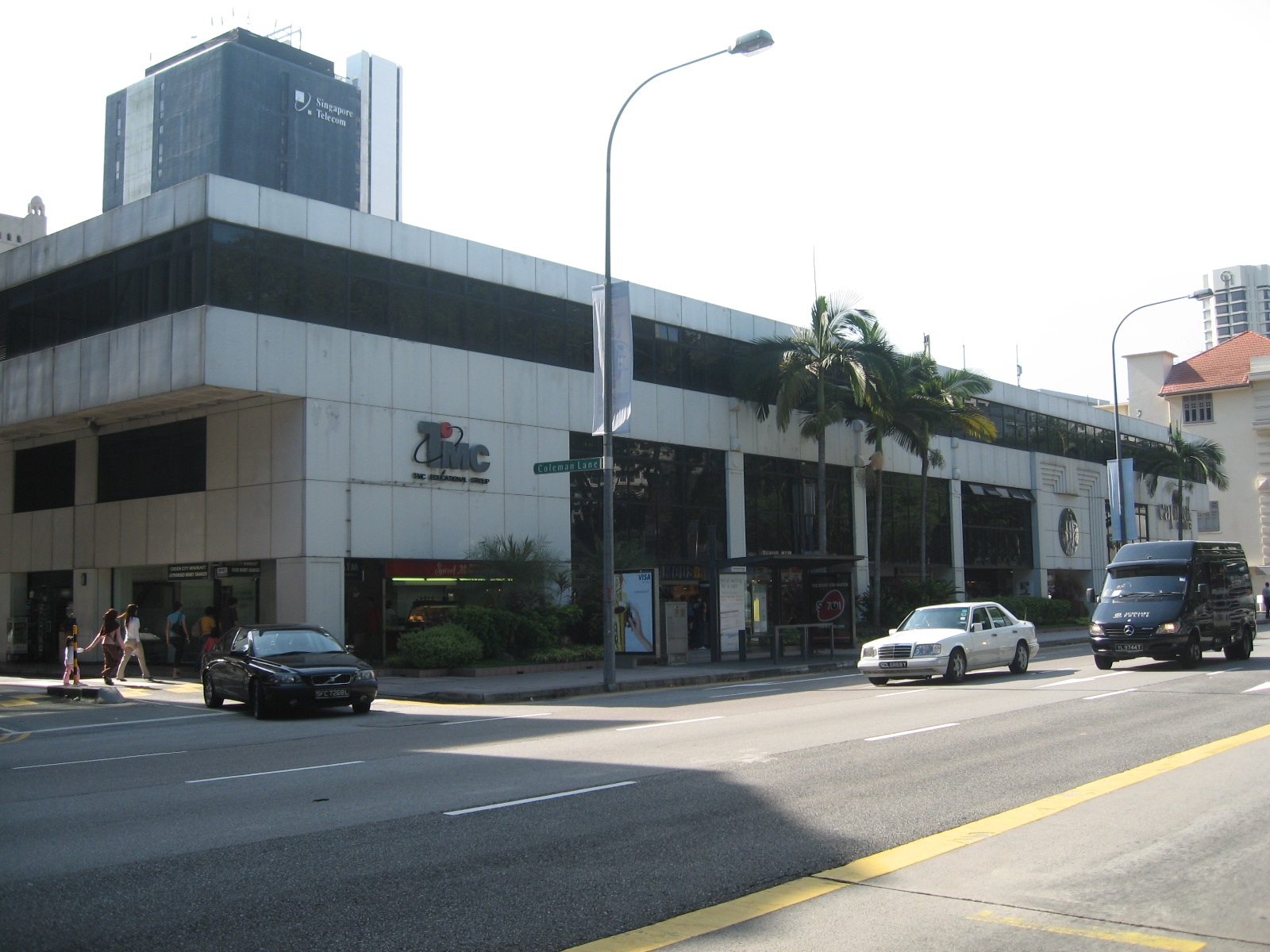
- Capitol Centre in May 2006

- Location within Singapore
- Former names: Capitol Shopping Centre; Capitol Car Park Station; Design Centre Singapore

General information
- Status: Demolished
- Location: Singapore, 141 North Bridge Road, Singapore 179099, Singapore
- Coordinates: 1°17′34.9″N 103°51′05″E
- Named for: Capitol Theatre
- Construction started: 1975
- Completed: 1976
- Opened: 1976
- Closed: 2012
- Demolished: 2012
- Owner: Urban Redevelopment Authority
- Landlord: Urban Redevelopment Authority

Technical details
- Floor count: 3
- Floor area: 14,000 square metres (150,000 sq ft)

The Capitol Centre was a building formerly located near the Capitol Theatre in Singapore. It was first built as a temporary resettlement centre in 1976, a parking station in 1985, a design centre in 1992, and back to a retail centre in 1995. The centre was demolished in 2012 under Capitol Singapore redevelopment project.

== History ==
Before the establishment of the Capitol Shopping Centre, a military social club known as Union Jack Club was open in 1924 for British sailors and servicemen on the other end of the area, which later became a large open-air car park for the Capitol Theatre's patrons in 1930. By the 1950s, the car park was converted into a bus terminus, which make it a popular place for locals due to its accessibility to the theatre. In 1963, a large neon advertisement tower known as the National Showroom Neon Tower was opened on 1 June 1963 by S. Rajaratnam. The Union Jack Club was later renamed to Commonwealth Services Club in 1964.

=== Construction of resettlement centre ===
The National Showroom was dismantled in 1974, and later the demolition the Commonwealth Services Club building and the bus terminus in 1975 for the construction of the three storey resettlement centre known as the Capitol Shopping Centre, which was built to accommodate about 114 retail shops and had 92 car park lots and 62 motorcycle lots.

=== Opening of resettlement centre ===
Upon its completion in 1976, the centre temporarily housed food stalls from Hock Lam Street, which was expunged to make way for the construction of the Funan Centre, and food stalls from High Street which was also expunged for the High Street Centre.

In 1978, The Shaw Organisation put up Capitol Theatre and Shaws Building for sale, however no deal had been reached. The Shaw Organisation later revealed plans to acquire the land of the Capitol Shopping Centre and to demolish it along with Shaws Building and Capitol Theatre in order to redevelop the site into a shopping complex and a multiscreen cinema with commercial and residential apartments.

However, under the Control of Rent Act 1953 of Singapore penal code, the Shaw Organisation had to provide compensation to its current tenants which proved a challenge to them.

=== Building conversions ===
After the food stalls and retail shops had been moved to the two new buildings by January 1985, in August 1985 the Capitol Shopping Centre was converted into a car park called the Capitol Car Park Station at a cost of S$542,000. The converted centre had 284 car spaces and 150 motorcycle spaces.

In April 1992, the centre was converted again into Design Centre Singapore, where exhibitions were held at the centre itself.

In May 1995, the centre was converted back into a shopping centre and renamed as Capitol Centre.

== Demolition ==
On April 3, 2008, the Singapore Land Authority announced that the Capitol Theatre, Capitol Building, Capitol Centre and Stamford House would be redeveloped in 2009. The 4 adjoining buildings occupied an area of about 1.45 hectares with a total of 250 tenants, including offices and retail outlets. Tenancy with retailers along the Capitol stretch will end by May 2009, and to have their businesses relocated elsewhere. Authority had finalise the eviction notice of the timing and details for the development plan of the site, three of the buildings except for Capitol Centre have been gazetted for conservation.

With Grant Associates working closely with the project's lead architect, Richard Meir and Partners Architects, the project consists of Singapore's largest cinema cum theatre complex, a luxury hotel and retail shops, with a total size of 21,000 square metres (230,000 sq ft). In November 2011, Shimizu Corporation was awarded the contract to develop a large scale mixed use complex called "Capitol Development".

The Capitol Centre was demolished by 2012, with the new shopping component Capitol Piazza and residential component named Eden Residences Capitol been built on its former site and were officially opened in May 2015.
