= Keys & Dowdeswell =

Keys and Dowdeswell was a major international architecture firm operating out of Shanghai, and designing buildings throughout China and South East Asia in the 1920s, 30s, and 40s. They designed some of the most prominent buildings in Kuala Lumpur and Singapore, bringing an international standard of luxury to the Asian hospitality market. Major P. Hubert Keys and Frank Dowdeswell were British architects who relocated to Shanghai, China. They were originally appointed by the Straits Government to design the general post office in Singapore, June 1, 1927. They were designated A.R.I.B.A (Associate of the Royal Institute of British Architects). They designed in a historicist tradition, with many of their buildings in the classical style, although their design approach changed over the years, and some of their buildings are classified as Art Deco, and a few are Modernist.

== Design ==
Major Keys & Dowdeswell were distinguished designers of classical façades and grand interior spaces. They followed the 20th-century Beaux-Arts tradition of classicism, and their works can be divided into three significant categories.

=== Governmental ===
Singapore’s colonial government was in the process of improving the health care due to overcrowding and scarcity of medical help. Therefore, the Governor commissioned Keys and Dowdeswell to design the Singapore General Hospital. This project also reflected the authority and power of the time.

=== Monumental ===
This was also an approach that aimed "bigness." Their buildings had a simple dignity and avoided superfluous features in order to have the image of grandeur. Their designs often contained a grand staircase and monumental clock towers.

=== Ornamental ===
Their version of classicism was far evolved from an initial study of Roman and Greek architecture. They used Doric and Ionic columns and sculpted decorations on their facades.

== Awards ==
In 1920, Keys and Dowdeswell won the Fullerton Building project through an architectural design competition which resulted in a building which is now one of the landmarks in Singapore, The Fullerton Hotel Singapore.

In 1929, Keys and Dowdeswell won the design competition for the Perak Turf Club, which is a horse race course in Ipoh. This was an achievement that significantly marks an appearance of modern architecture in Malaya before World War II.

== Buildings ==
BUILDING IN MALAYSIA	YEAR	BUILDING IN SINGAPORE
-	1921	King Edward VII College Of Medicine; College Road
-	1926	Singapore General Hospital; Third Hospital Ave
-	1928	Fullerton Hotel; Downtown Core
Perak Turf Club; Ipoh, Perak, Malaysia	1929	KPM Building; Robinson Road
-	1930	Capitol Theatre, Capitol Building; Downtown Core
Mercantile Bank Of India; Ipoh, Perak	1931	-
Majestic Hotel; Kuala Lumpur	1932	China Building; Chulia Street
Lam Looking Building; Ipoh, Perak	1933	-

=== KPM Building ===
KPM Building was a Classical building with some modern touches that Keys and Dowdeswell designed for Koninklijke Paketvaart-Maatschappij or known as Royal Packet Navigation Company of Batavia; it lies at the junction of Robinson Road and Finlayson Green Road in Singapore. It was constructed entirely with reinforced concrete while the exterior are left with masonry finishes which is an imitation of granite. This six storey building was occupied with KPM offices in the ground floor while the other floors were let to various commercial building.

The building has several interesting features and innovative elements that are brought into the design which includes the basement that functioning as a parking space, the first use of such a function in Singapore. Another innovation were the lifts that were installed at three entrances of the building. The KPM office flooring are lined with marble tiles and there is a mezzanine floor above it for the accommodation of the staff to separate them from the public
