= Mirza Mohamed Ali Namazie =

Persian merchant

Mirza Mohamed Ali Namazie JP
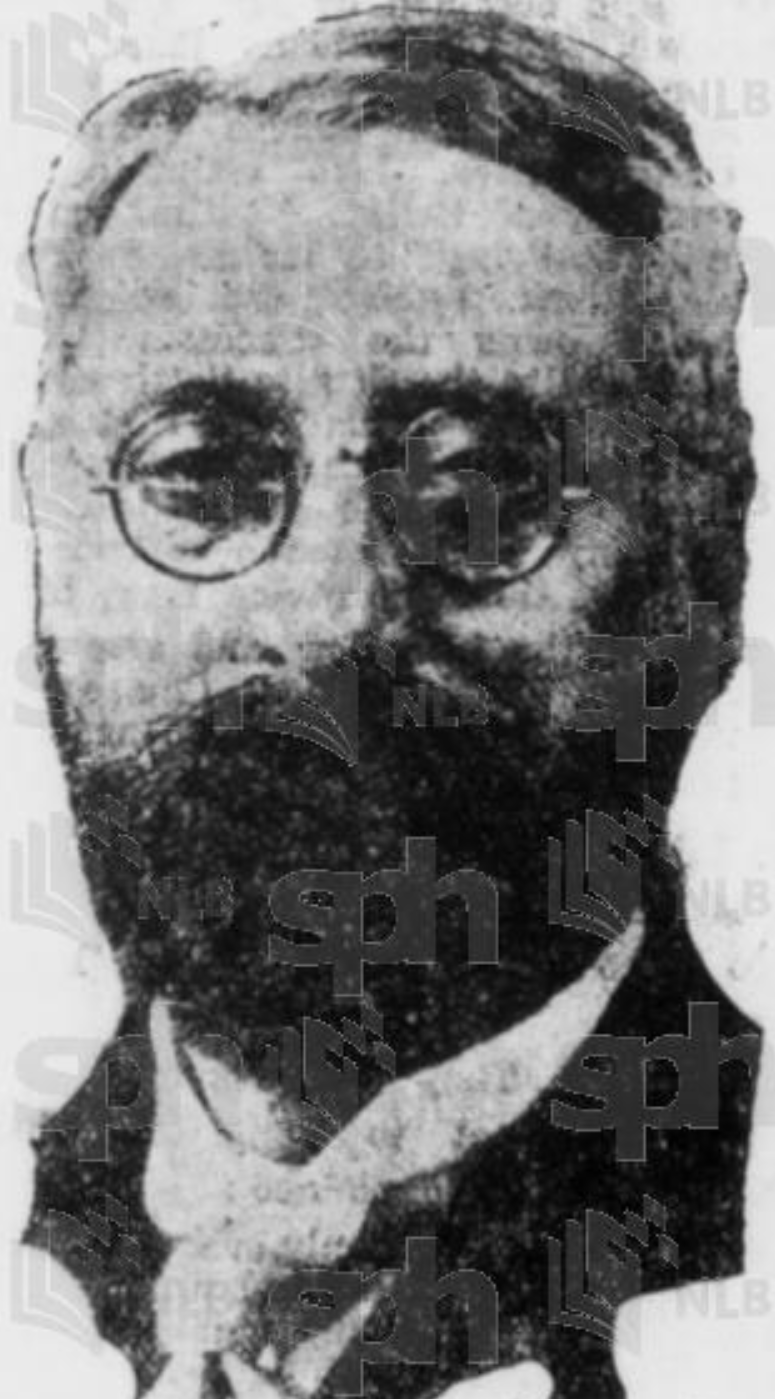
- Mirza Mohamed Ali Namazie
- Born: 1864; Madras, British India
- Died: July 26, 1931 (aged 66–67); Singapore
- Occupation: merchant
- Employer(s): M. A. Namazie and Sons
- Spouse: Zeevar Khadijeh Sultan Reshty
- Children: 12

Mirza Mohamed Ali Namazie (1864 - 26 July 1931), was a Persian merchant, property owner, and founder of the firm M. A. Namazie and Sons in Singapore.

== Biography ==
Namazie was born in Madras in 1864, which his father had emigrated to, in 1864. In 1909, he moved to Singapore and carried on work as a general merchant, as well as an agent for Namazee, a shipping firm from Hong Kong. He was also employed in a patent flooring agency.

Namazie owned a large amount of property in both Singapore and Madras. He helped develop 3,000 acres of rubber and palm oil plantations. He established a trust fund of over RS 100,000 for charity in Madras. He founded the firm M. A. Namazie and Sons, which was successful.

Namazie was a Justice of the Peace and a member of the Singapore Municipal Commission for several years. He was also a member of the Mohammedan Advisory Board. His last business venture was the financing of the Namazie Mansions and Capitol Theatre. He was a prominent figure in the Indian community of Singapore.

== Personal life ==
Namazie had four sons and eight daughters, including Mohamed Javad Namazie.

Namazie died on 26 July 1931 from a heart attack at his residence on 12 Scotts Road. His funeral was held on the next day. Before his death, he revoked a clause in his will which would leave a third of his property to charity, as "he had made a number of charitable bequests since the will was drawn up." All performances at the Capitol Theatre were cancelled for at least two days. His body was brought to Arabia to be buried.
