= Pratomo =

Pratomo can be both a middle name and a surname. Notable people with the name include:

- Jaya Pratomo Ibrahim (1948–2015), Indonesian interior designer
- Eddy Pratomo (1953–2026), Indonesian diplomat
- Purwaka Yudhi Pratomo (born 1984), Indonesian football centre-back and defensive midfielder
