= Capitol Singapore =

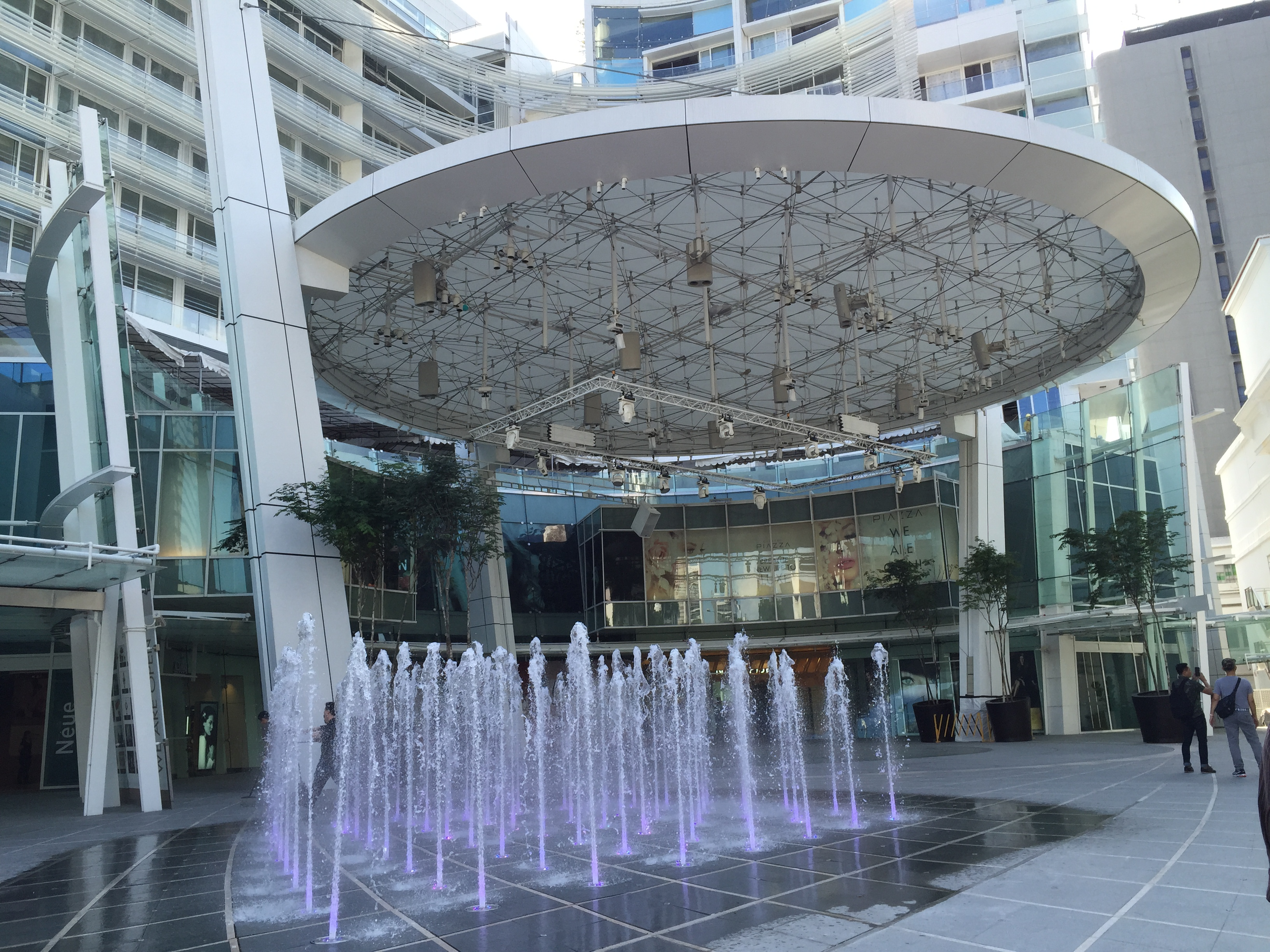
- The Plaza at the Capitol Piazza, Singapore
- Location: Downtown Core, Singapore
- Coordinates: 1°17′36.1″N 103°51′04.0″E
- Address: 13 Stamford Road, Singapore 178905
- Opened: March 2015
- Developer: Capitol Investment Holdings
- Manager: Capitol Singapore
- Owner: Capitol Singapore
- Architect: Richard Meier & Partners Architects
- Floors: 2, 4 basements
- Public transit: NS25 EW13 City Hall
- Website: capitolsingapore.com

Capitol Singapore is an integrated development located in Singapore’s Civic and Cultural District, comprising the iconic Capitol Theatre, a high-end retail mall, the Eden Residences Capitol, The Capitol Kempinski Hotel Singapore, and the Arcade at The Capitol Kempinski—a sunlit atrium hosting several modern and classical dining establishments. It also houses three conservation buildings, namely Stamford House, Capitol Theatre and Capitol Building.

== History ==
Built on the former site of the Capitol Centre as the part of Capitol Singapore development by Capitol Investment Holdings, the Capitol Piazza was partially opened in late March 2015. The two storey mall with four basements consists of the following sections: an Open Plaza, an Arcade, the Galleria and Neue. The complex's hotel, The Capitol Kempinski is housed in the former Stamford House and Capitol Theatre buildings. Previously destined open as Pontiac Land-branded "Patina Singapore", the Jaya Ibrahim-designed hotel suffered significantly delays in opening due to owner-related disputes. The hotel finally opened as The Capitol Kempinski, three years after its completion, after a 528 million Singapore Dollar buyout of the property by shareholder, Perennial Holdings.

Several notable food and beverage outlets were opened at the mall. The mall was also the place where the Finnish fashion store Marimekko and the Spanish shoe store Carmina Shoemaker opened their first stores in Singapore in late March and July 2015 respectively. However, most of them had since closed down prior to the mall's upcoming renovation in late 2019.

In 2020, Capitol Piazza was renovated and renamed to Capitol Singapore.

== Gallery ==
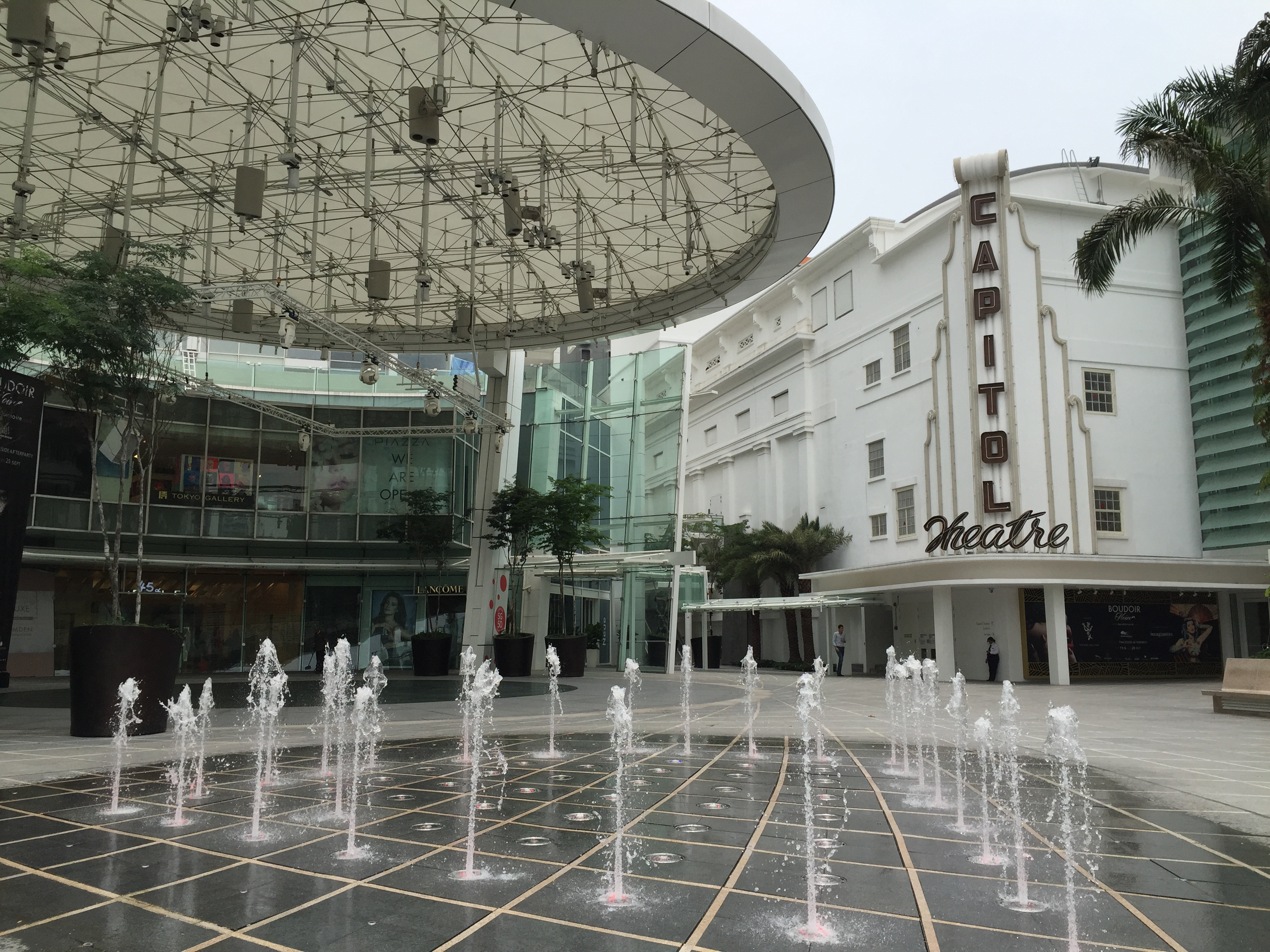
Capitol Singapore's Open Plaza, and the nearby Capitol Theatre, Singapore

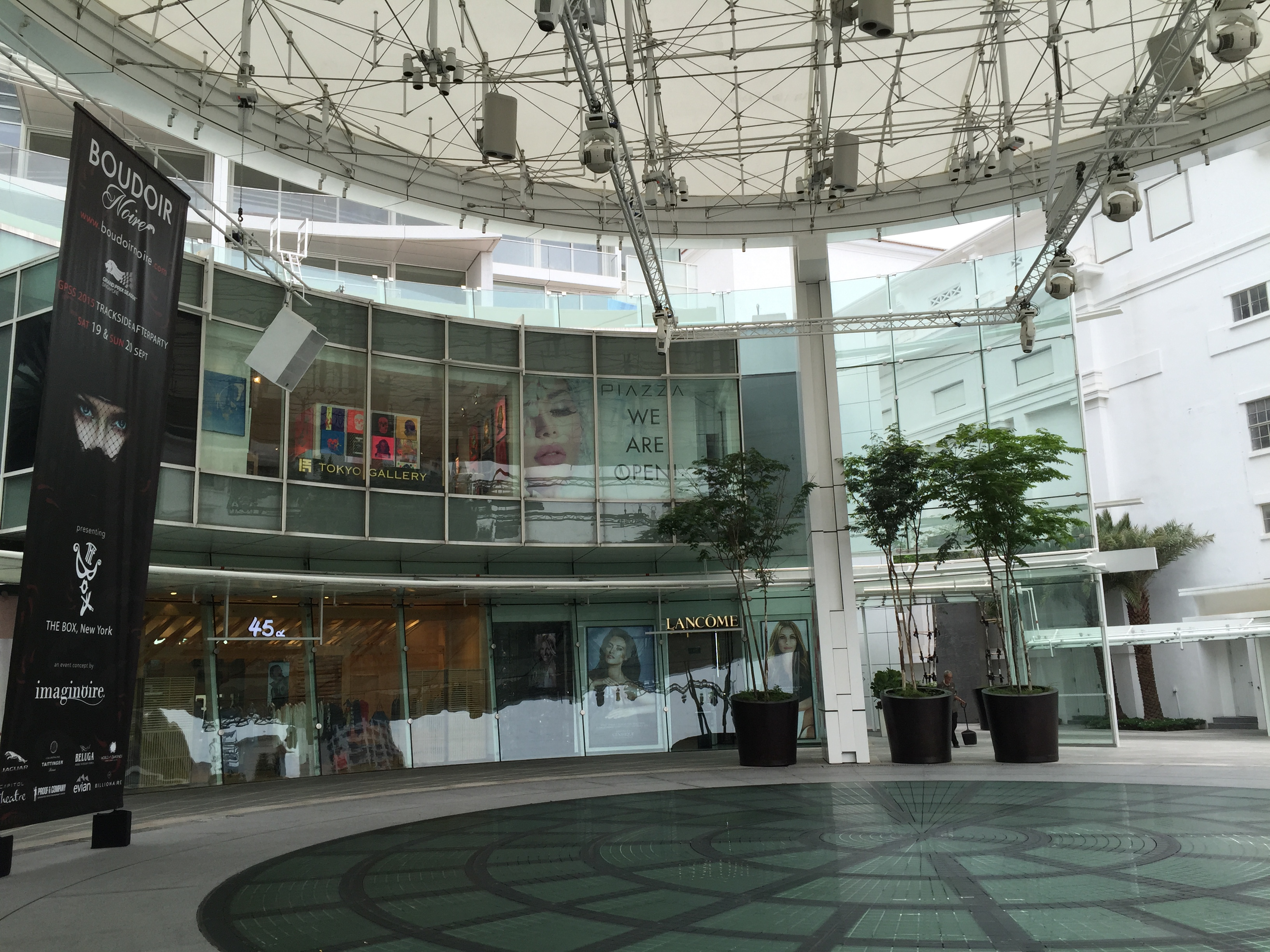
Open Plaza

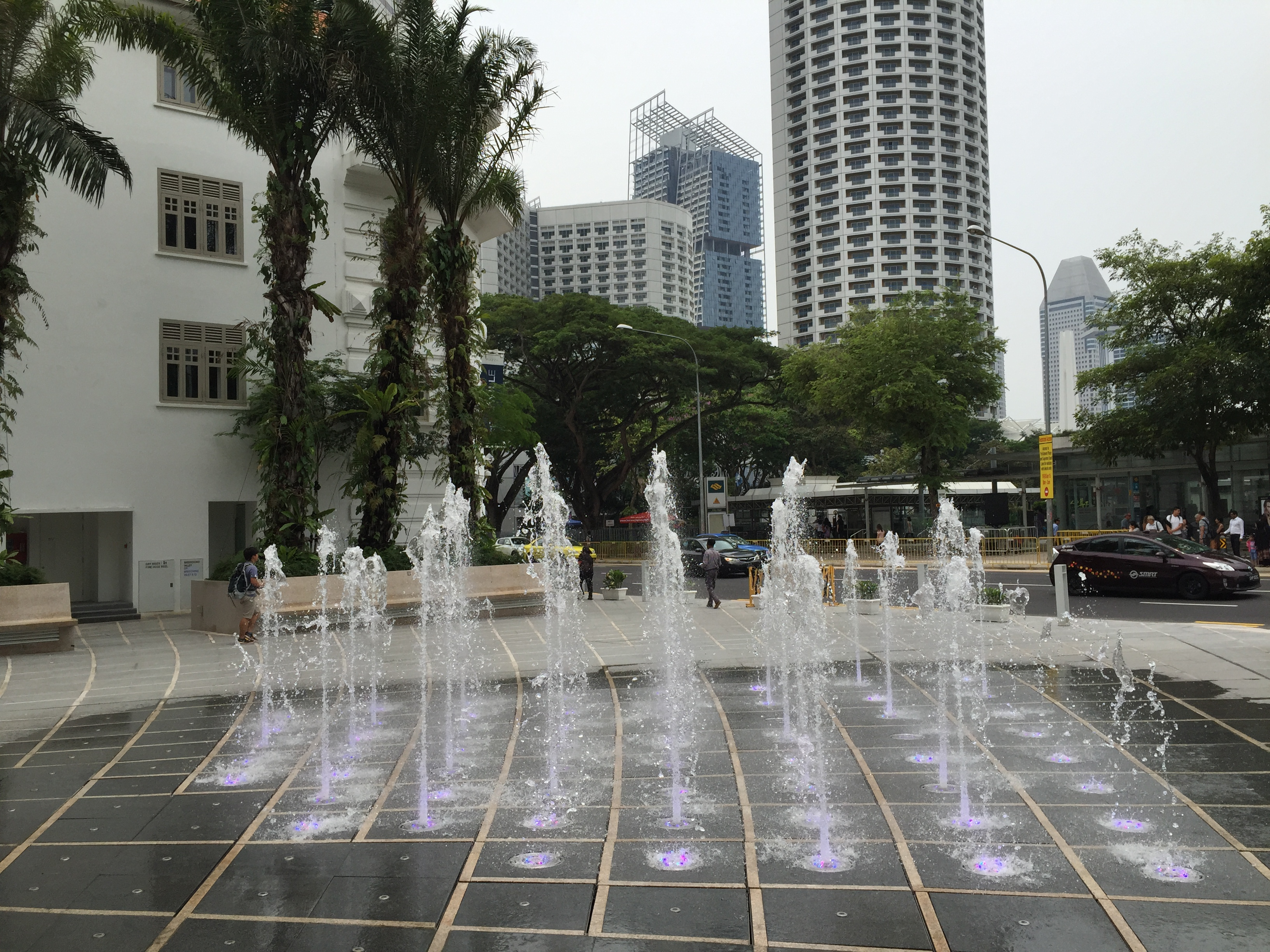
Capitol Singapore's fountain

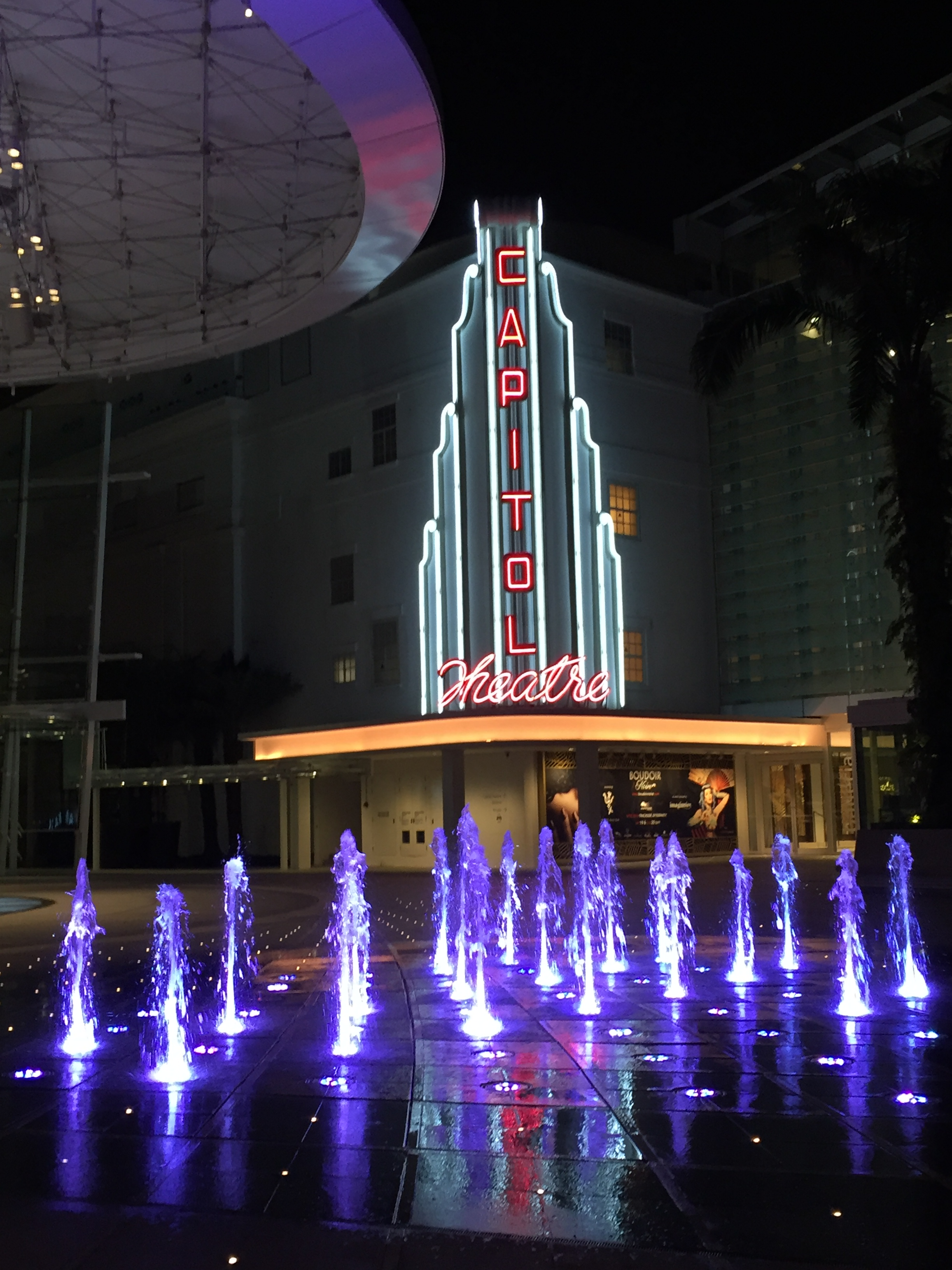
Capitol Piazza's fountain at night

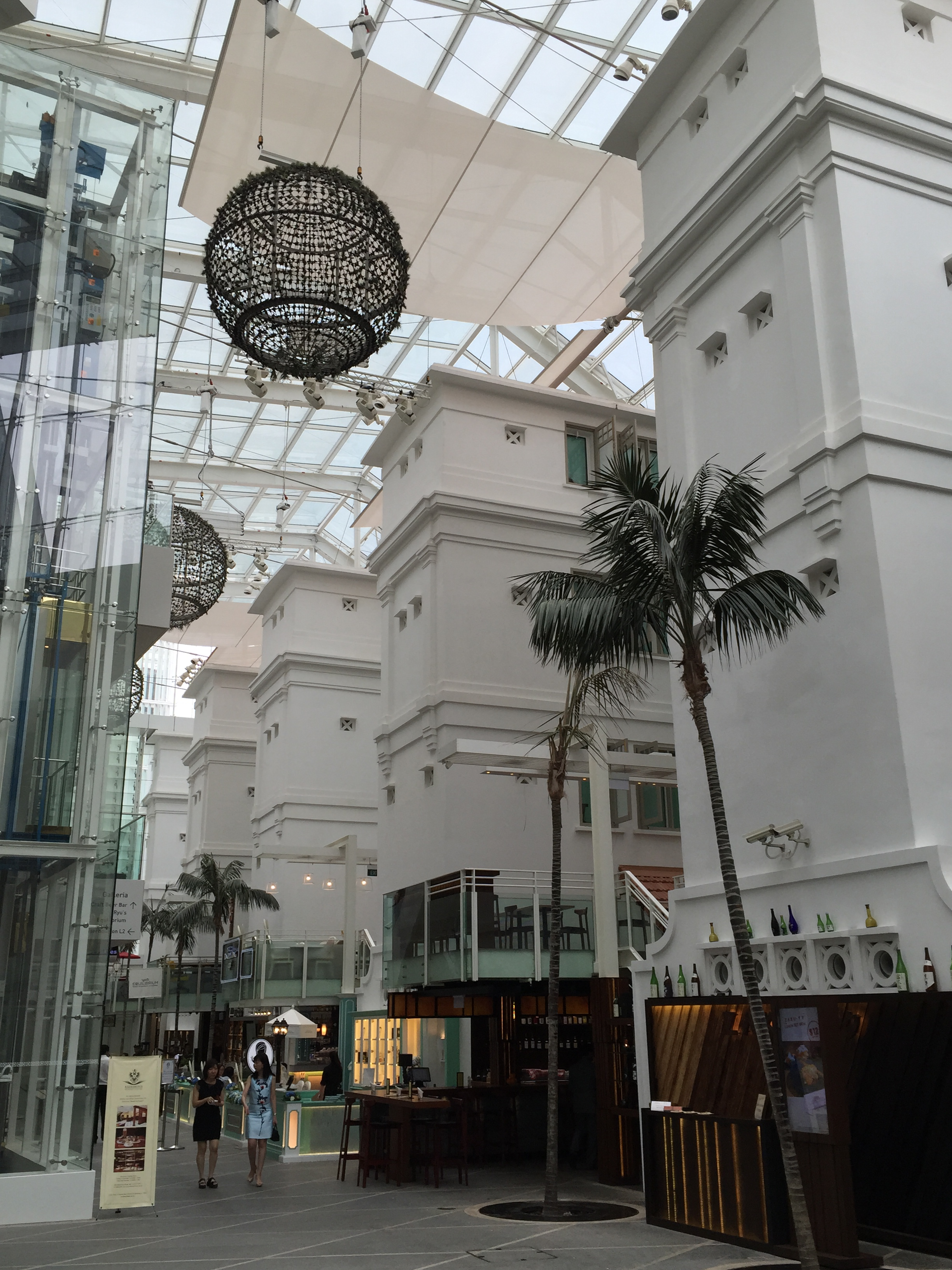
The Galleria of the Capitol Singapore

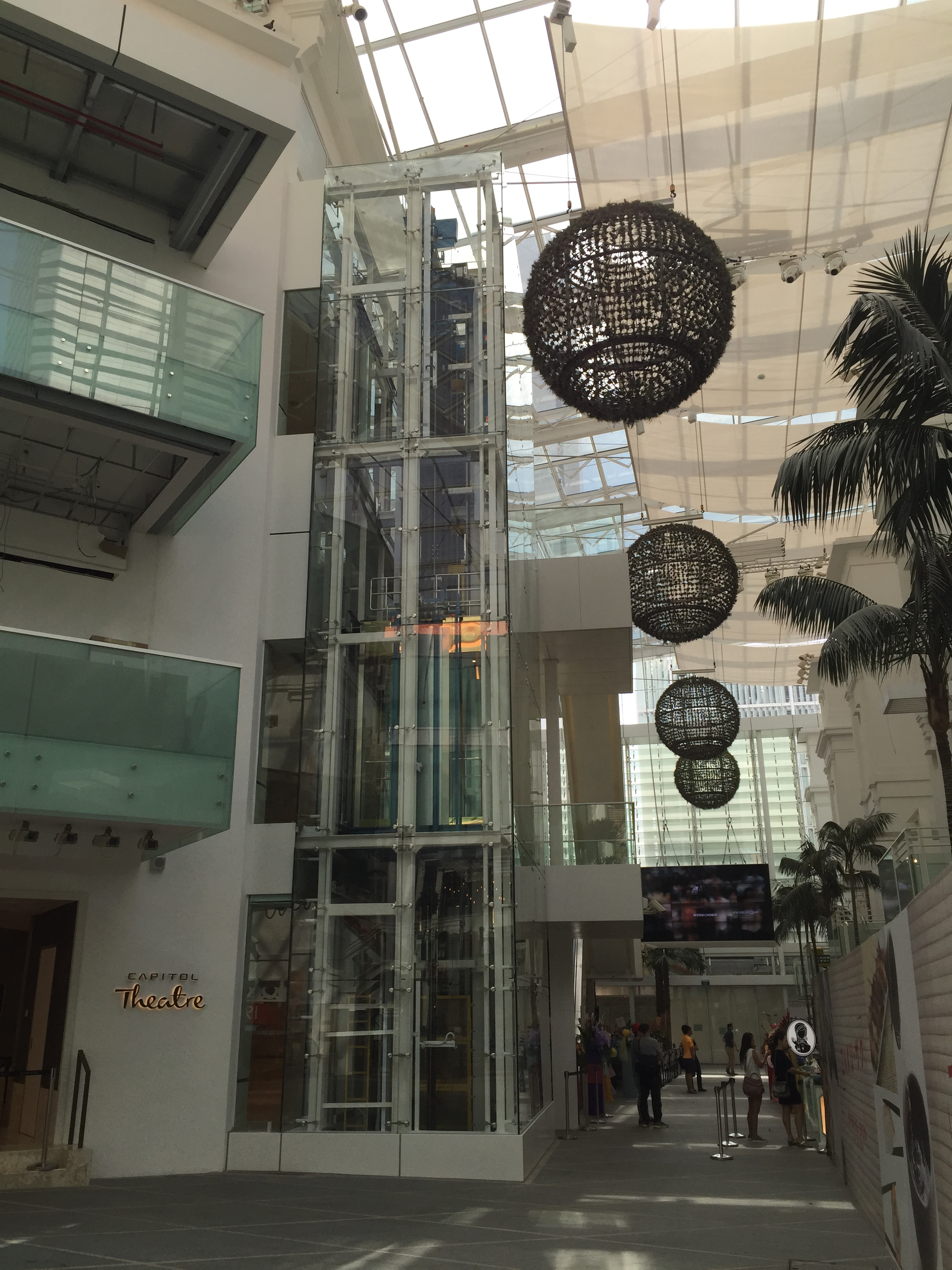
The Galleria of the Capitol Singapore, on the left is one of the entrances to the Capitol Theatre

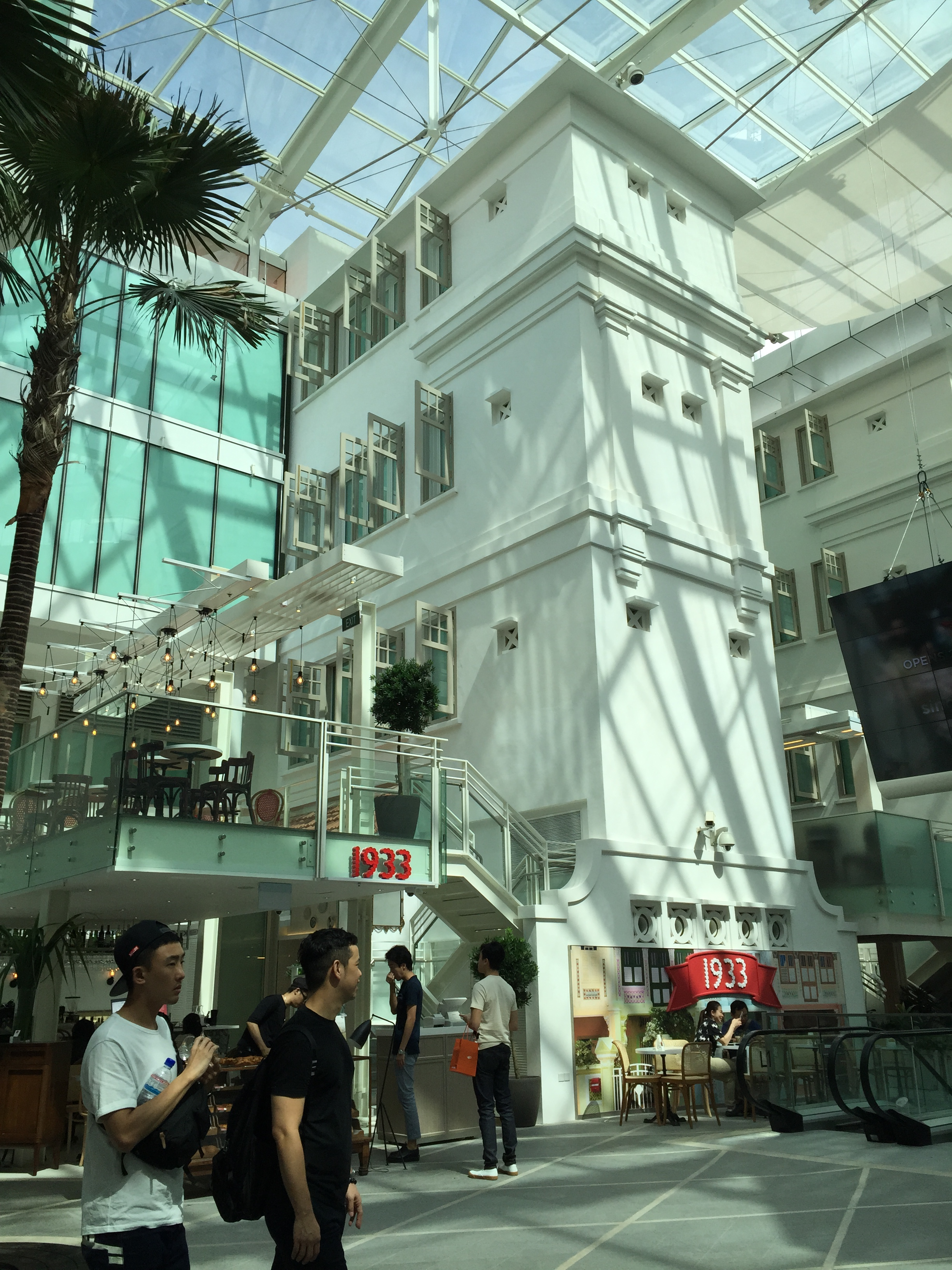

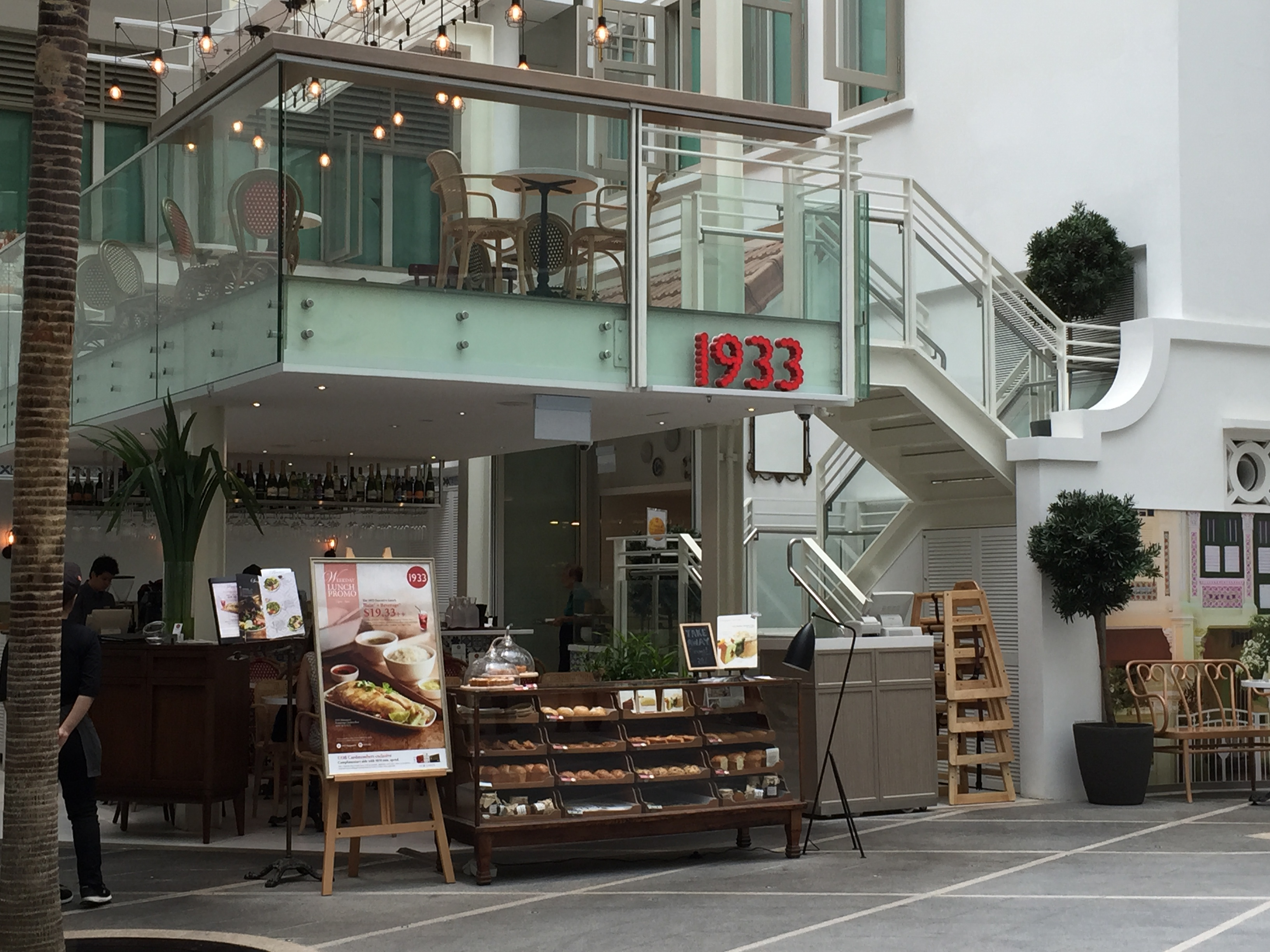
Former 1933 restaurant at The Galleria, Capitol Singapore, Singapore.

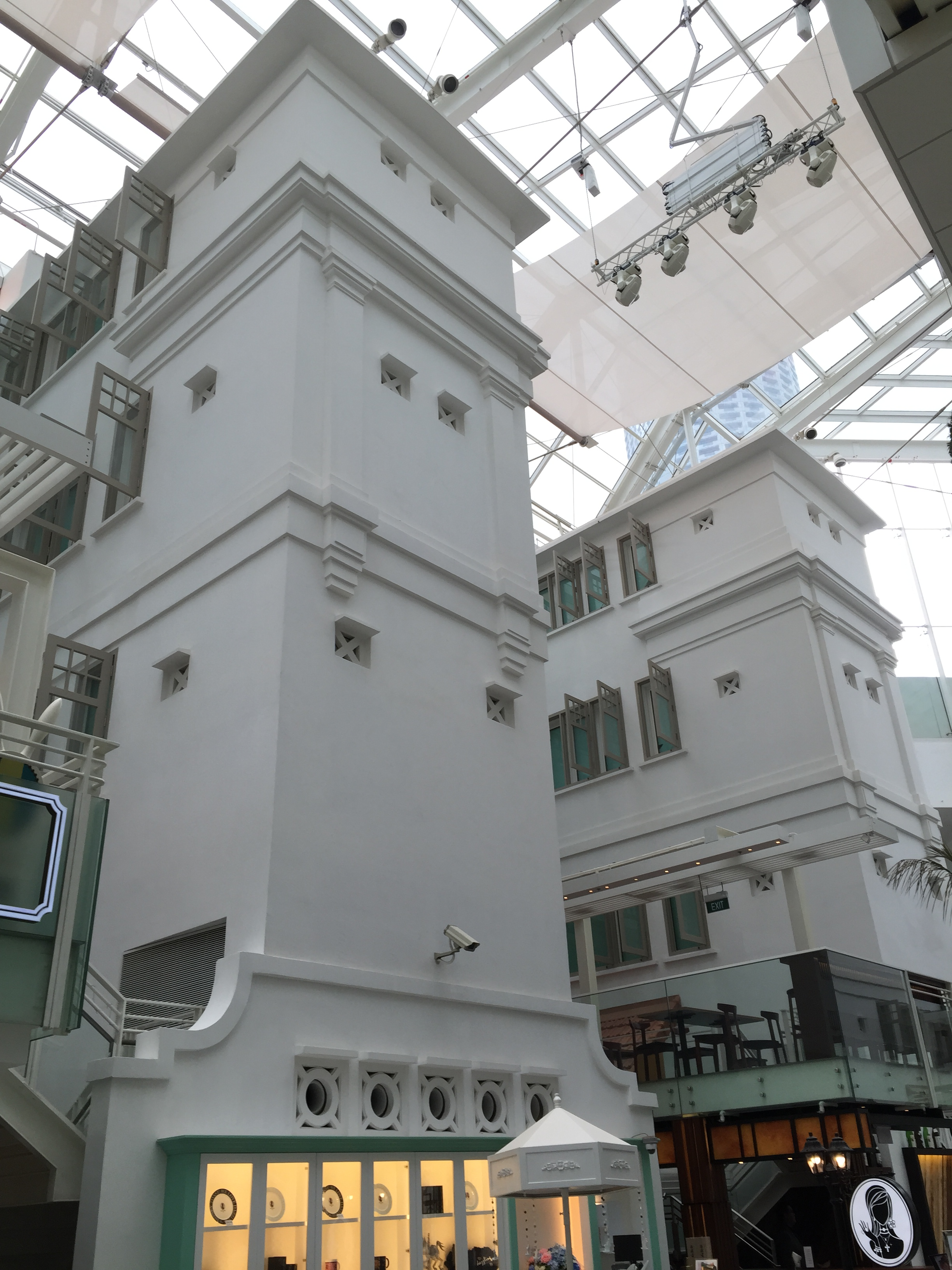

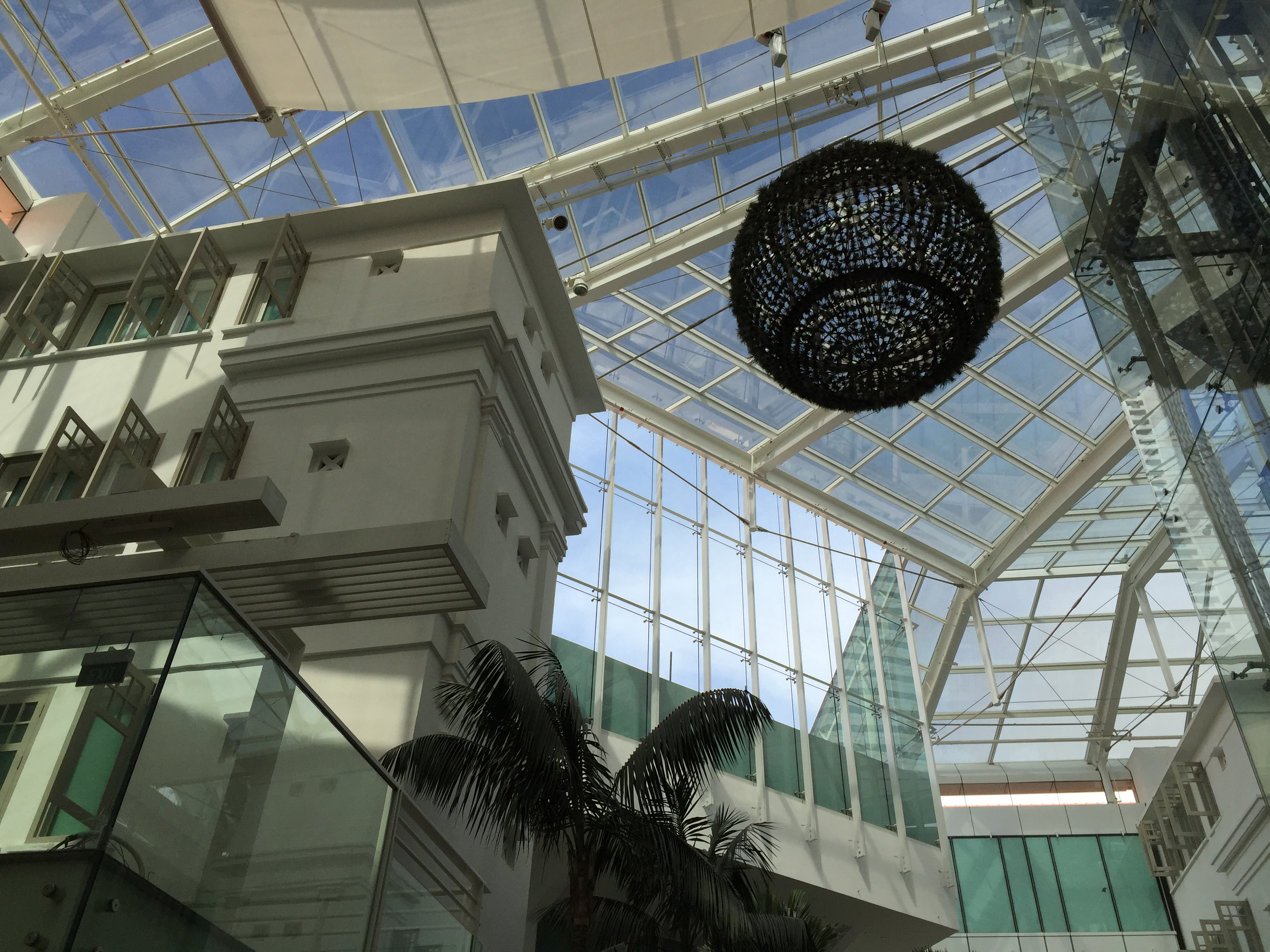

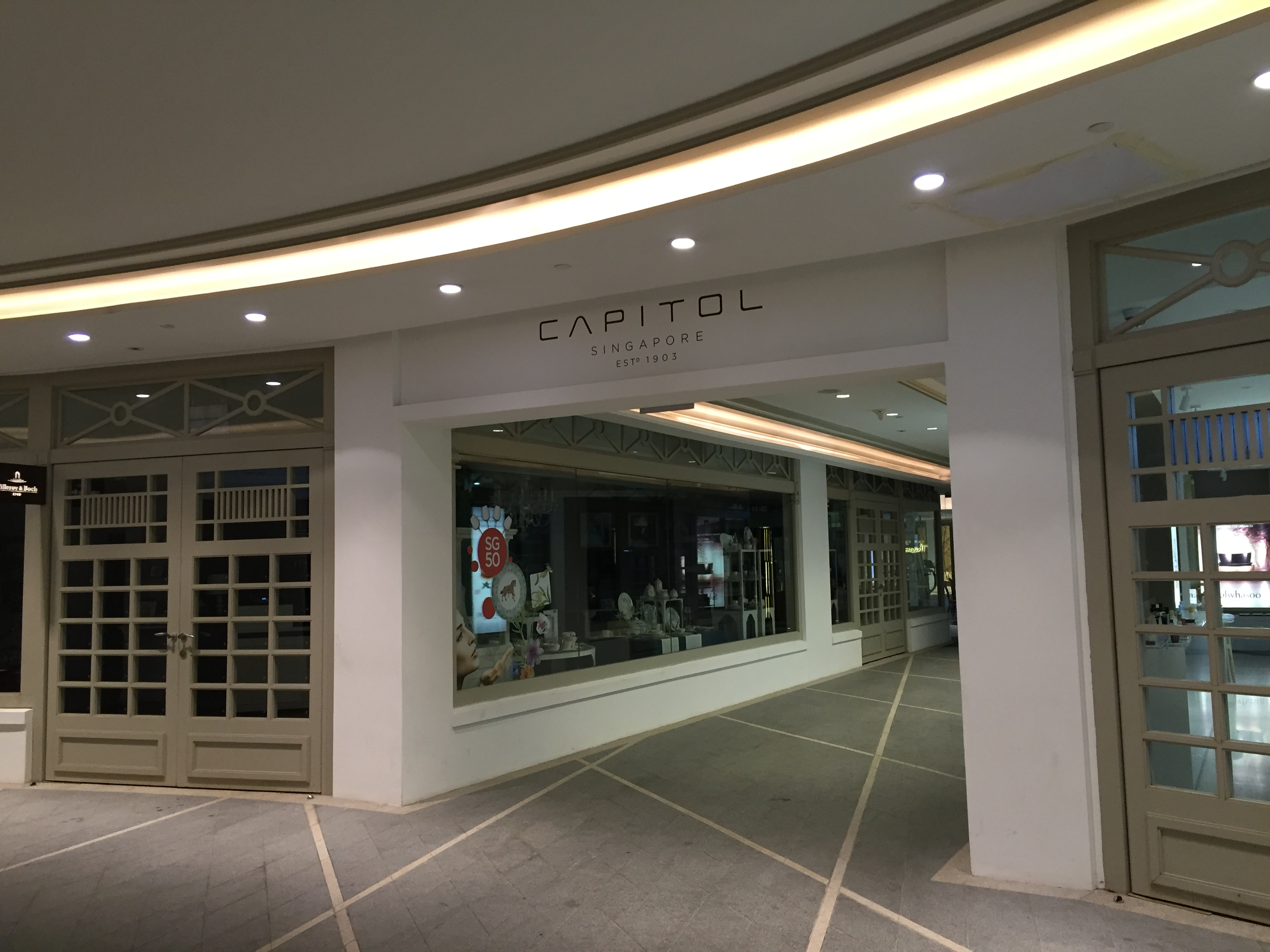
A linkway to Capitol Building, part of The Capitol Kempinski Hotel Singapore

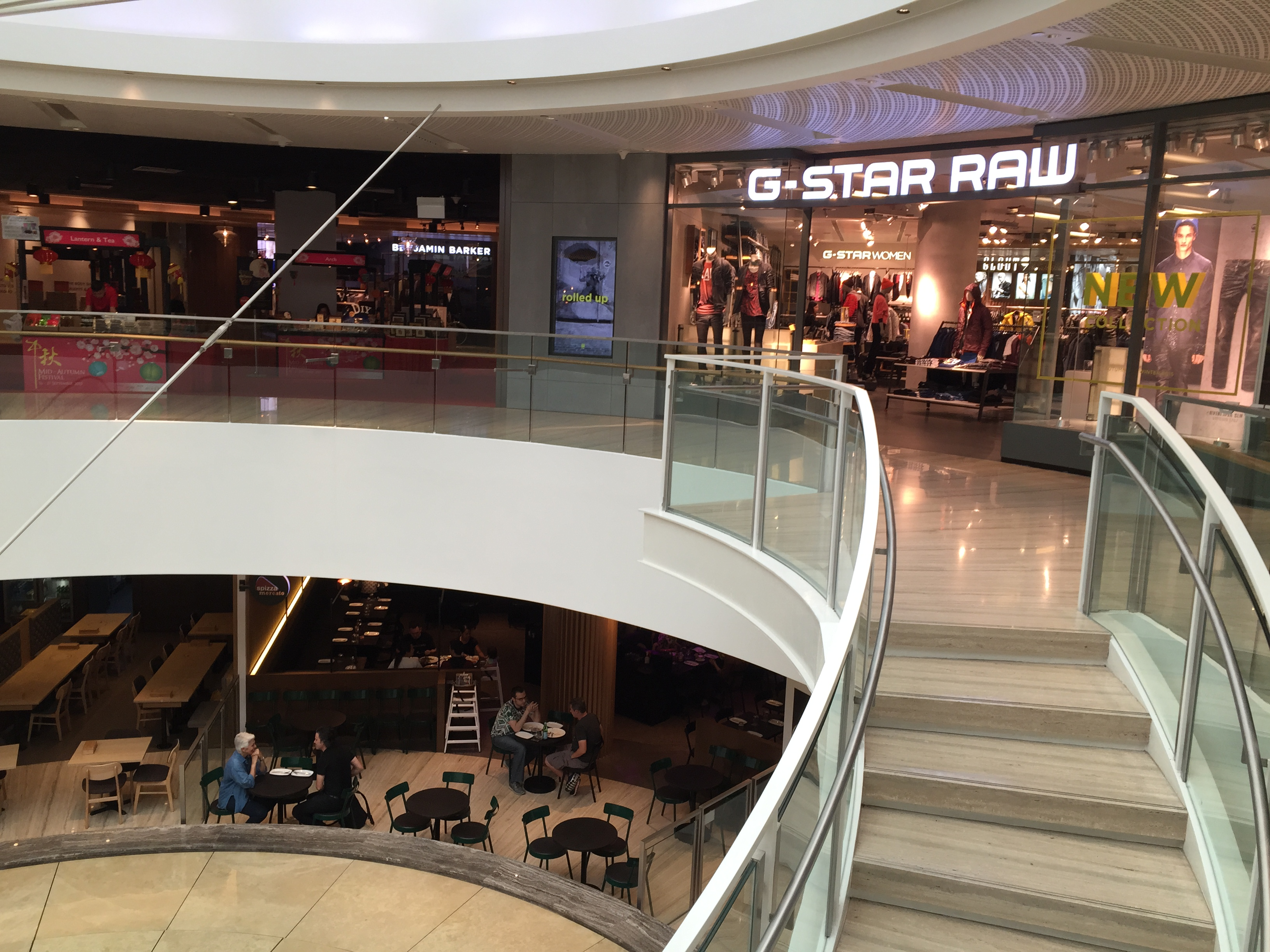
Interior of Neue

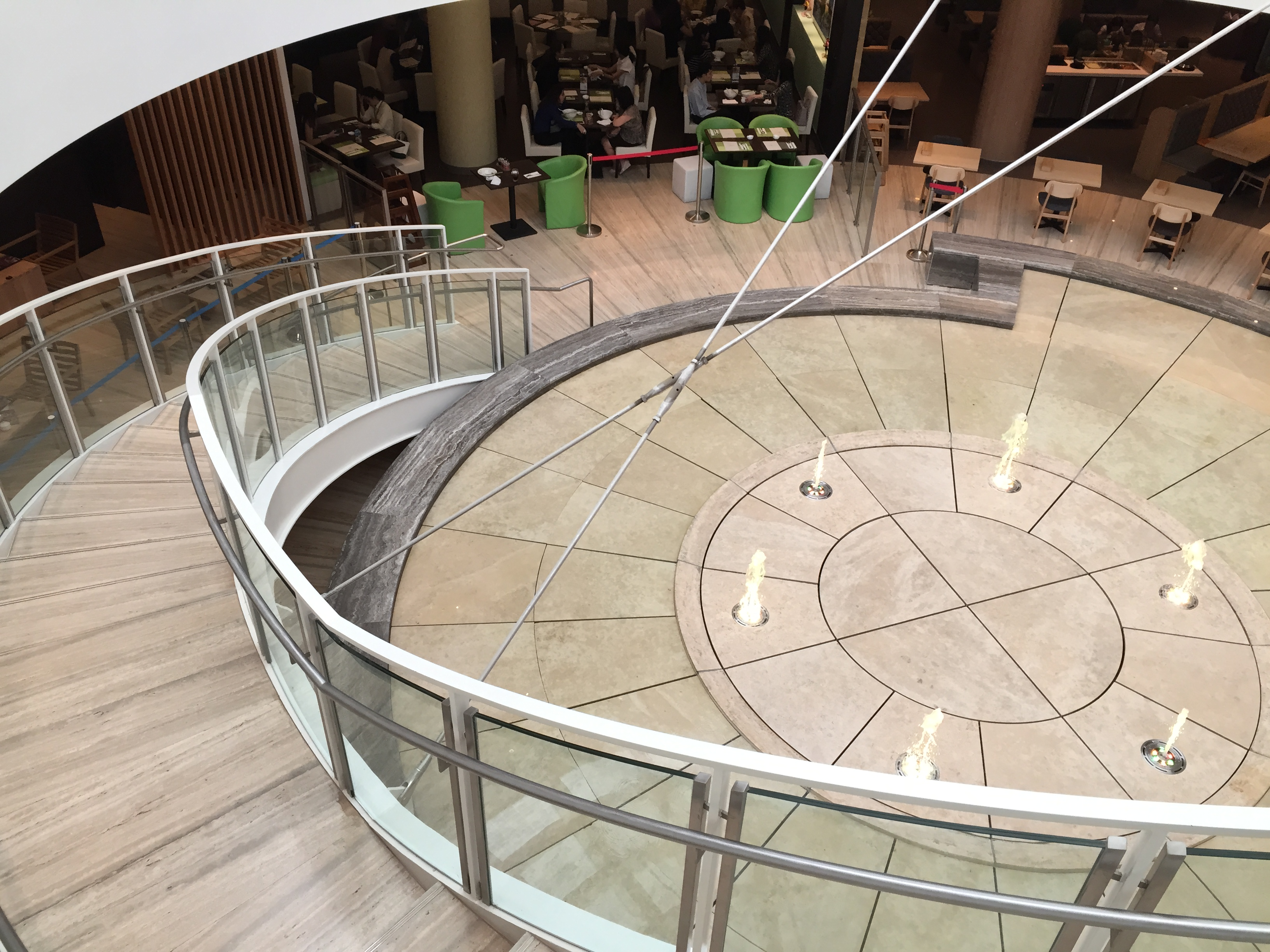
Stairway of Neue, Capitol Singapore, Singapore

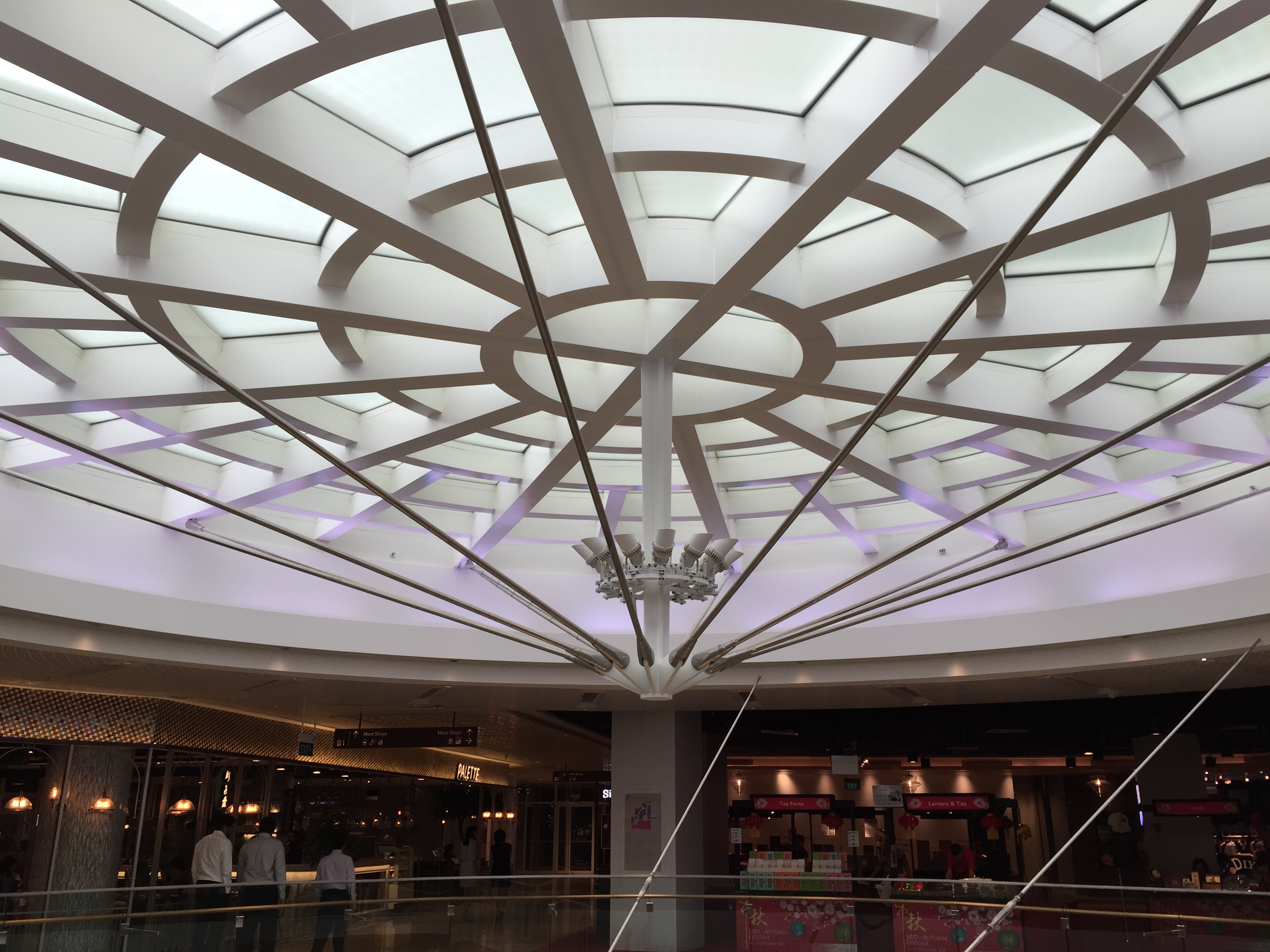
Ceiling of Neue, Capitol Singapore, Singapore
