= Capella Resort, Singapore =

Hotel and resort located on Sentosa Island, Singapore

Capella Singapore
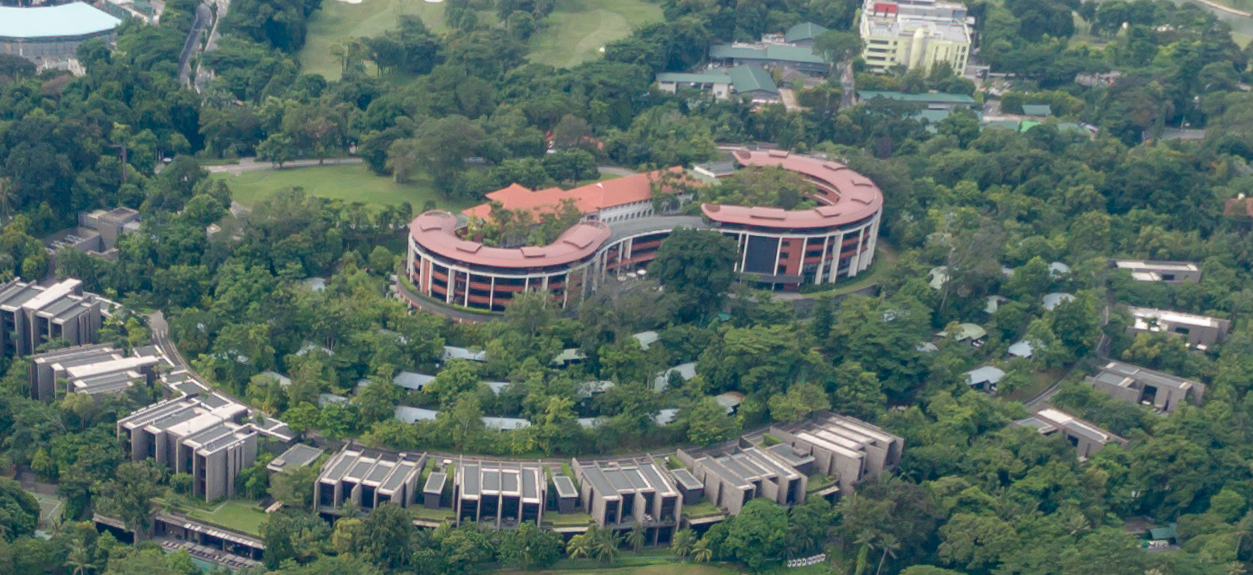
- Aerial view of Capella (2016)

- Location within Singapore

General information
- Status: Completed
- Type: Hotel
- Location: 1 The Knolls, Sentosa Island, Singapore
- Coordinates: 1°14′58″N 103°49′28″E
- Construction started: 2003
- Completed: 2009
- Operator: Capella Hotels and Resorts

Technical details
- Floor area: 95,246 m^{2} (1,025,220 sq ft)

Design and construction
- Architects: Foster and Partners; DP Architects Pte Ltd
- Structural engineer: Web Structures Pte Ltd
- Main contractor: Tiong Seng Group

Website
- capellahotels.com/en/capella-singapore

Capella Singapore is a luxury resort hotel situated in 30 acres (12 ha) of grounds and gardens located on Sentosa Island, Singapore. It has 113 manors, suites and guestrooms designed by Norman Foster. It was developed by Pontiac Land Group and officially opened in March 2009. Capella Singapore's long-stay accommodation arm, The Club Residences at Capella Singapore comprises 81 serviced apartments, duplexes and manors.

== Architecture and design ==
The hotel, which opened in 2009, was designed by architectural firm Foster and Partners in collaboration with DP Architects Pte Ltd. Its interiors were designed by Indonesian interior designer, Jaya Ibrahim. The landscape architecture was designed by Coopers Hill. The building integrates two Tanah Merah military buildings dating from the 1880s with a new hotel, villas, event spaces and a spa.

The Tiong Seng Group was the building and civil contractor of the Capella Singapore with Millenia Hotel Pte Ltd. as their client.

== 2018 North Korea–United States summit ==
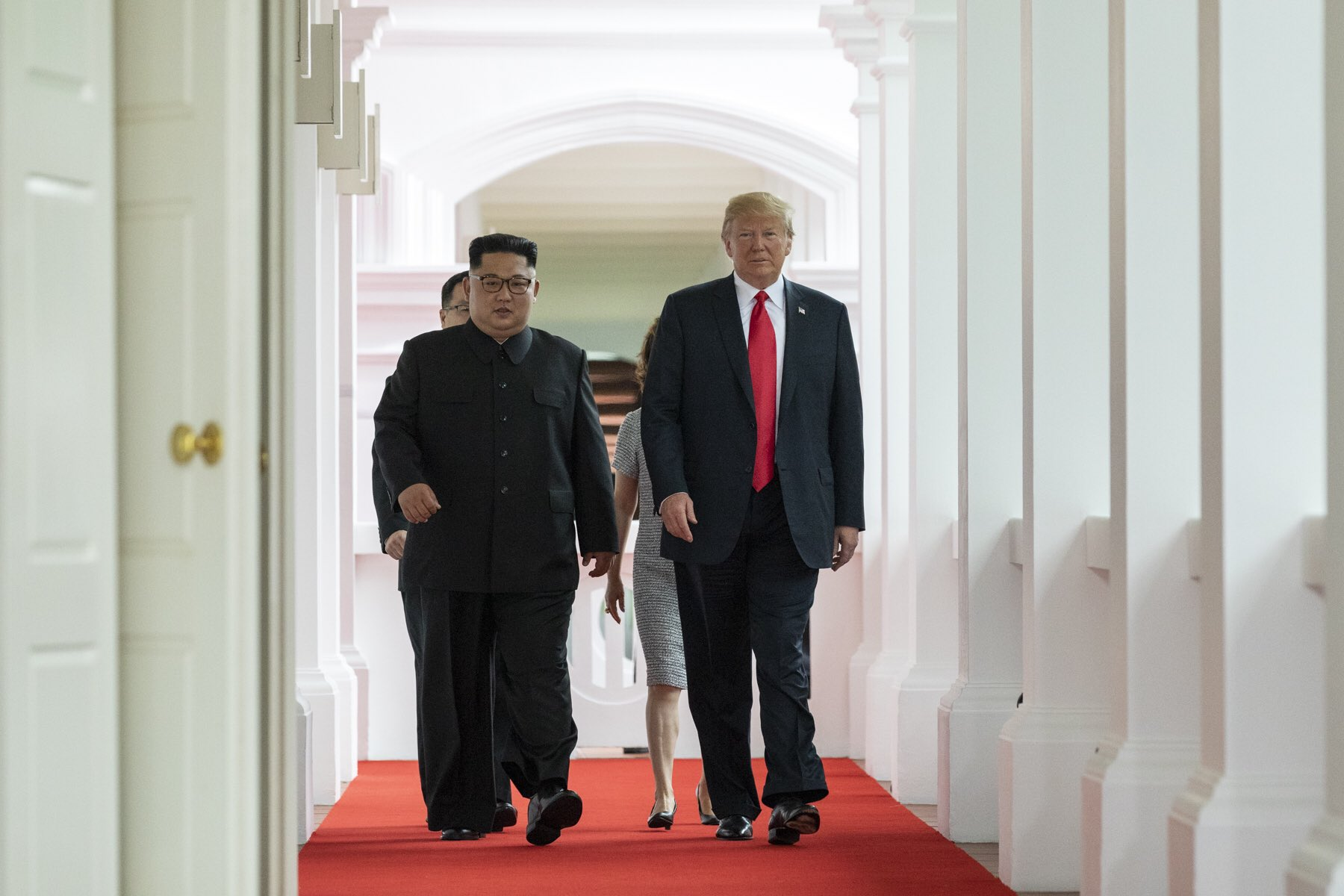
North Korean leader Kim Jong Un and U.S. President Donald Trump walking at the resort

The 2018 United States–North Korea Summit was held at the resort beginning at 9:04 a.m. Singapore Standard Time on 12 June 2018. Singapore announced the several locations related to the Trump-Kim summit would be designated as "Special event areas" and secured by both leaders' own personal security teams, elite Singaporean police, and the Gurkha Contingent of Singapore.
