= Jaya Ibrahim =

Notable Indonesian interior designer

- Born: Jaya Pratomo Ibrahim; April 17, 1948; Yogyakarta, Indonesia
- Died: May 15, 2015 (aged 67)
- Education: University of York
- Occupation: Interior Designer
- Notable work: Capella Singapore; Capitol Kempinski Hotel; The Setai

Jaya Pratomo Ibrahim (17 April 1948 – 5 May 2015) was an Indonesian interior designer best known for his works in hospitality design. A protégé of British actress-turned-designer Anouska Hempel, his works are characterised by a trademark colour-coded symmetrical design. Often described to be calming and tranquil, amongst his most celebrated works are the interiors for The Legian in Bali and The Setai in Miami.

== Early life and education ==
Ibrahim was born in Yogyakarta, Indonesia on 17 April 1948, to a Sumatran diplomat and a Javanese princess. He spent his childhood moving between his grandmother's Java home and travelling with his parents. As a child, he had aspired to become an architect—a dream that was not realised due to his parents' aversion to the career choice. After moving between Indonesia and Singapore, he later enrolled at the University of York to study Sociology and Economics. Following his graduation from York, he briefly took a job as an accountant for a year before leaving after being discouraged by the job's demands. He joined the back of house at Anouska Hempel's Blakes Hotel in London as a dishwasher. There, he met Hempel, who later took notice of his attention to detail and made him her assistant. Having observed Ibrahim's consistently symmetrical and colour coded table settings for her lunches, Hempel ultimately decided to train Ibrahim as her apprentice. In an interview with Prestige in 2014, Ibrahim said of Hempel's style being self-taught from experience and common sense was something he related to, and admired her "lateral thinking"

== Career ==
Ibrahim's designs have been covered in various major design magazines and featured in many design publications. Often characterised by the media as exuding calmness, tranquil and inviting, the favourable reception to his designs have been attributed on his decisions in making a pragmatic and functional design that revolves around its setting or location as a focal point. In a 2012 interview with Indonesia Design, he ascribed the success of his works to the liveability of his designs, through well-thought out circulation along with symmetry that he claims induces relaxation.

His first work following his apprenticeship with Hempel was the design of his parents' home in the mid-1980s, influenced by the Memphis movement and the works of architect Sir Edwin Luytens. Citing a lack of projects due to the UK's then economic woes, Ibrahim returned to Indonesia in 1992 to establish his own design practice in Yogyakarta. His first commercial project was completed in 1996, in what later became known as The Legian hotel in Seminyak, Bali; first conceived as an apartment complex, the building was converted into a hotel after sudden revocations of the site's residential permits. The success of The Legian earned him considerable international recognition, which led to significantly more hospitality-related projects for Ibrahim in the next decade. In 2004 following the completion of the Setai hotel in Miami Beach, he met his business partner Bruce Goldstein, with whom he later would run his design practice in Singapore. On a visit to his parents' 1980s home in Jakarta, Indonesian-hotelier Adrian Zecha took liking to Ibrahim's designs and admired its proportions and volume; this ultimately led him to design several Aman hotels in China later in the 2000s.

Between 2003 and 2009, he worked on the interiors of the Capella hotel on Sentosa Island, which later served as the setting of the 2018 North Korea–United States Singapore Summit. In 2012, a book on Ibrahim's designs, entitled Jaya: Contemporary Design with a Pedigree, was published. In the same year, a namesake hospitality brand under the name Jaya Hotels & Resorts was launched; the project was halted upon Ibrahim's sudden death in 2015 and never materialised despite renewed backing by Two Roads Hospitality in 2017. In 2014, he was awarded the Outstanding Contribution Award at Hotel Design Awards in Singapore.

== Death and legacy ==
Ibrahim died on 5 May 2015 after sustaining injuries from a fall in his house in eastern Jakarta. A funeral service in his name was conducted shortly after at Capella Singapore, the site of one of his projects. His firm, Jaya International Design (JID) was later acquired and absorbed into Singapore-based design practice, Blink Design Group in 2017. The restaurant at Miami's Setai Hotel, Jaya, was posthumously named in homage of Ibrahim.

== Selected works ==
- The Legian Seminyak, Bali, Indonesia (1992)
- Rosewood Dharmawangsa Hotel, Jakarta (1997)
- The Setai Miami Beach, Florida, USA (2004)
- The Nam Hai, Hoi An, Vietnam (2006)
- The Datai, Langkawi, Malaysia (2007)
- Aman at Summer Palace, Beijing, China (2008)
- Capella Hotel, Sentosa, Singapore (2009)
- Amanfayun, Hangzhou, China (2010)
- Patina Hotel, Singapore (2015)
- Four Seasons Jimbaran, Bali, Indonesia (2016, posthumously completed)

== Gallery of works ==
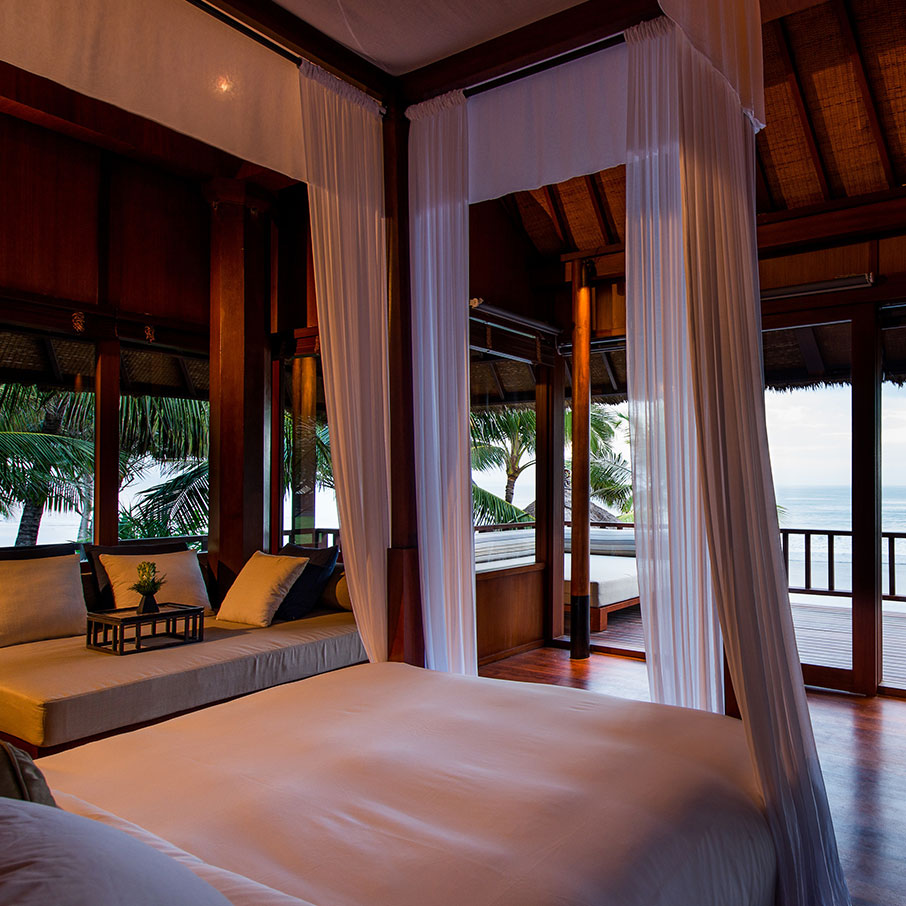
Legian Hotel, Bali (1992)

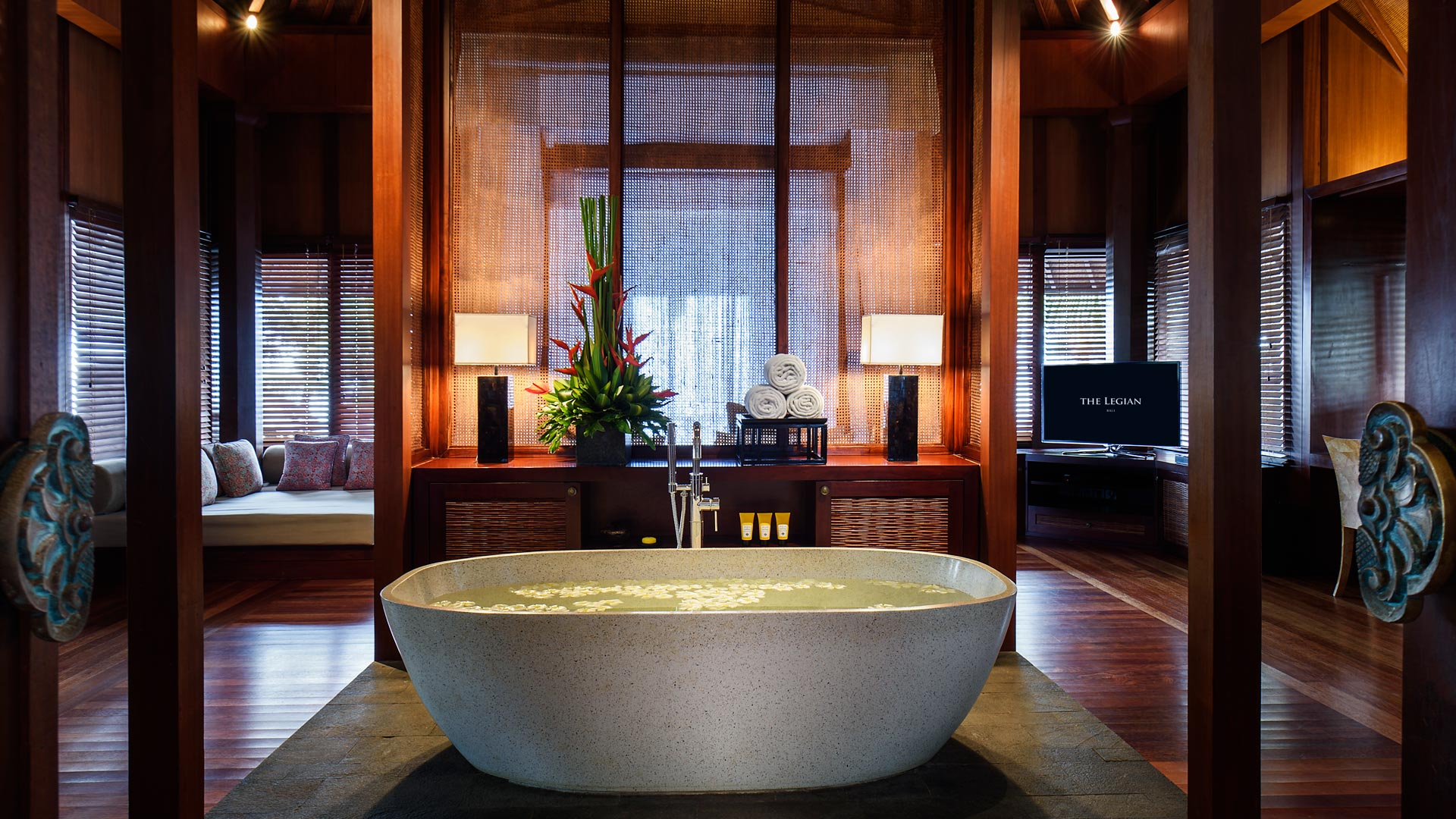
Legian Hotel, Bali (1992)

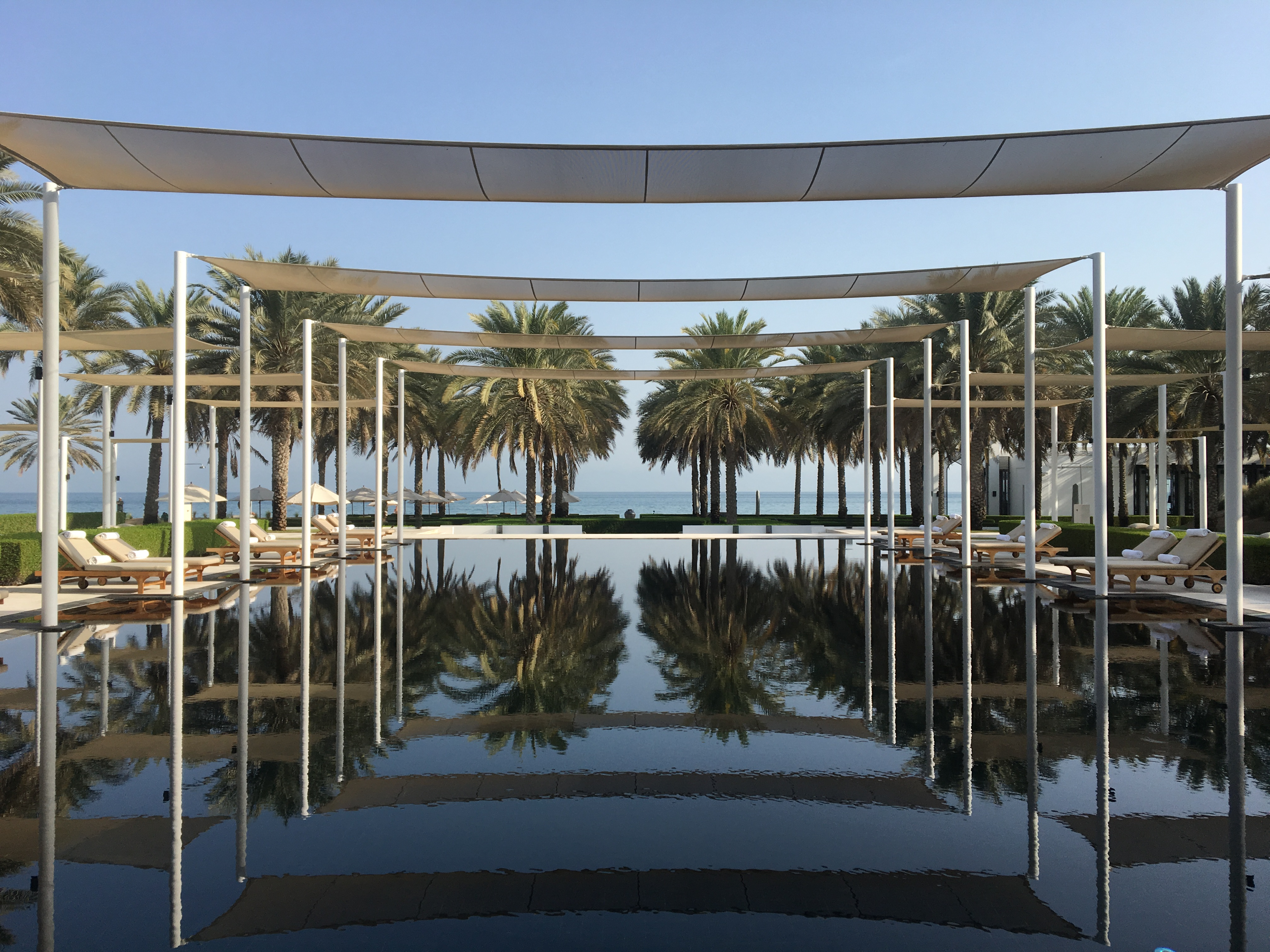
Chedi Hotel, Muscat (2003)

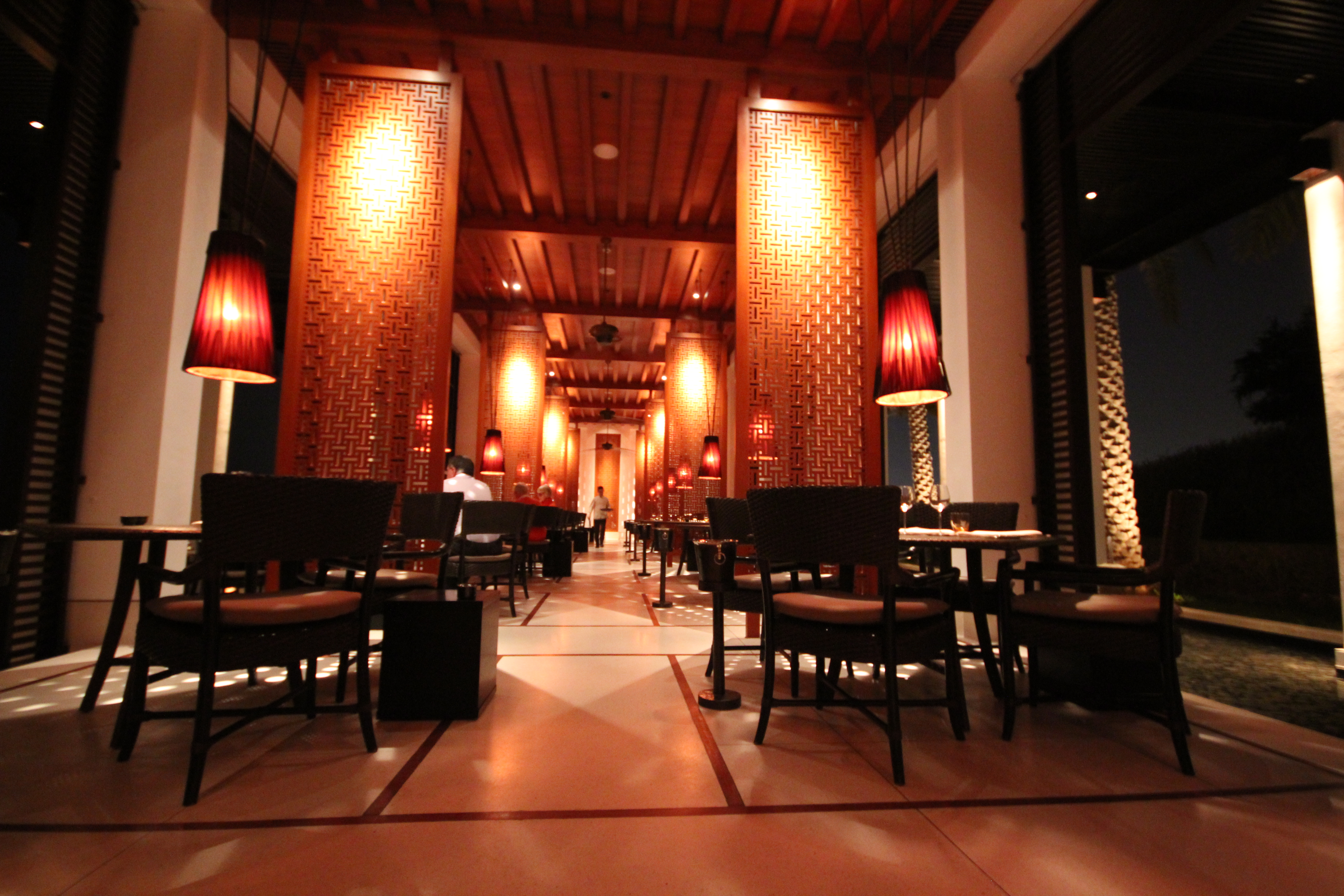
Chedi Hotel, Muscat (2003)

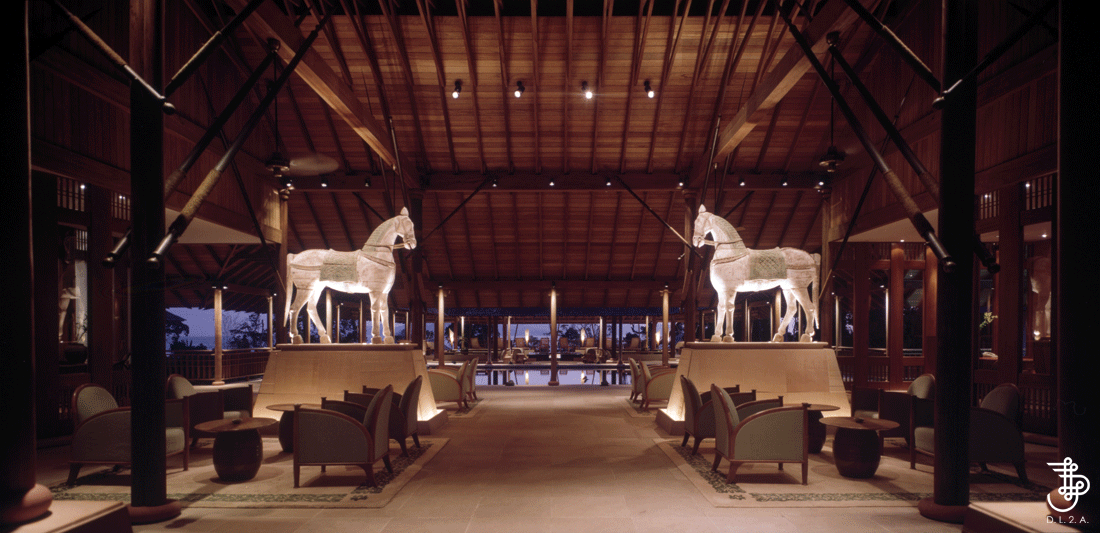
Datai Hotel, Langkawi (2007)

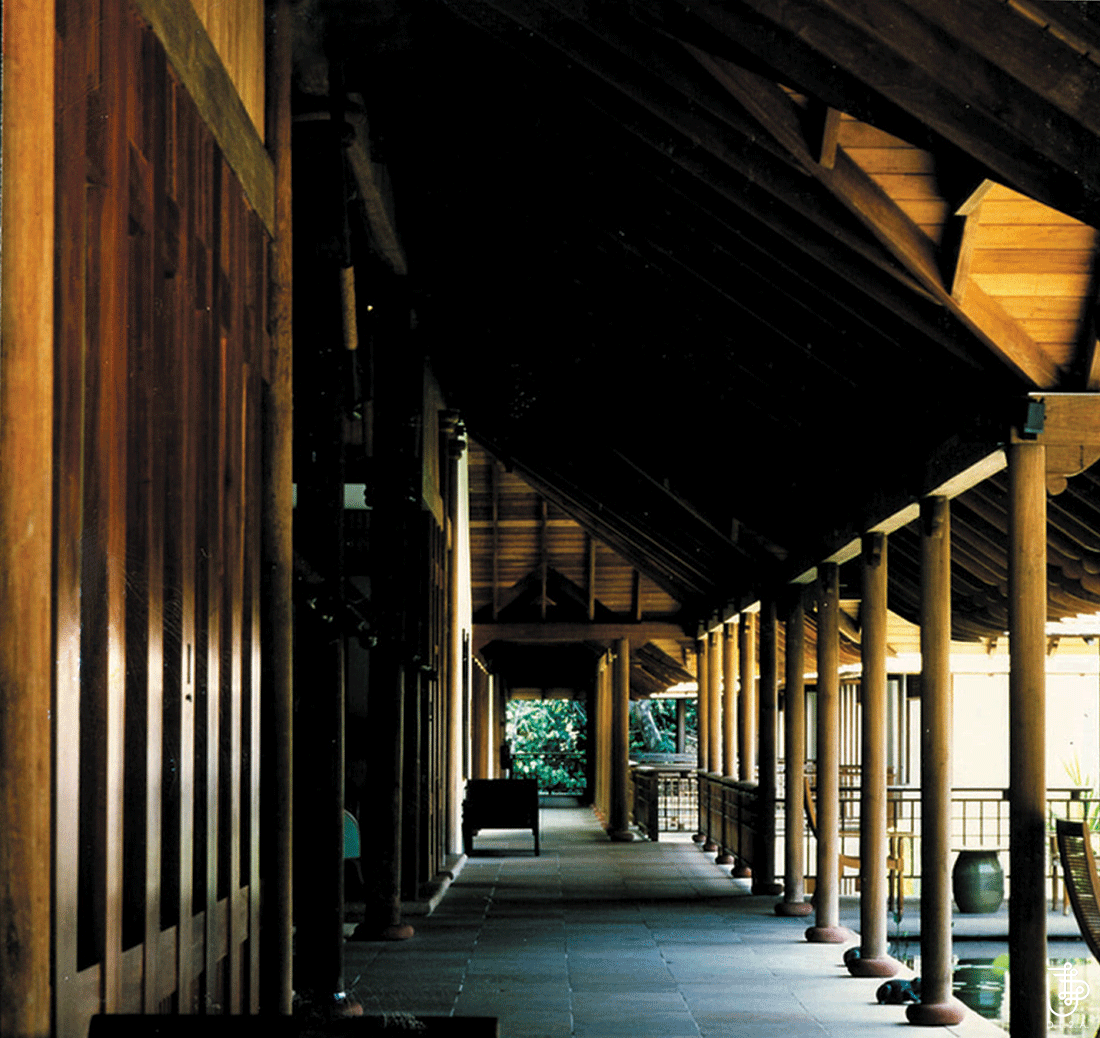
Datai Hotel, Langkawi (2007)
