= Sculpture Square =

Nonprofit arts organization in Singapore

Coordinates: 1°17′59″N 103°51′7″E

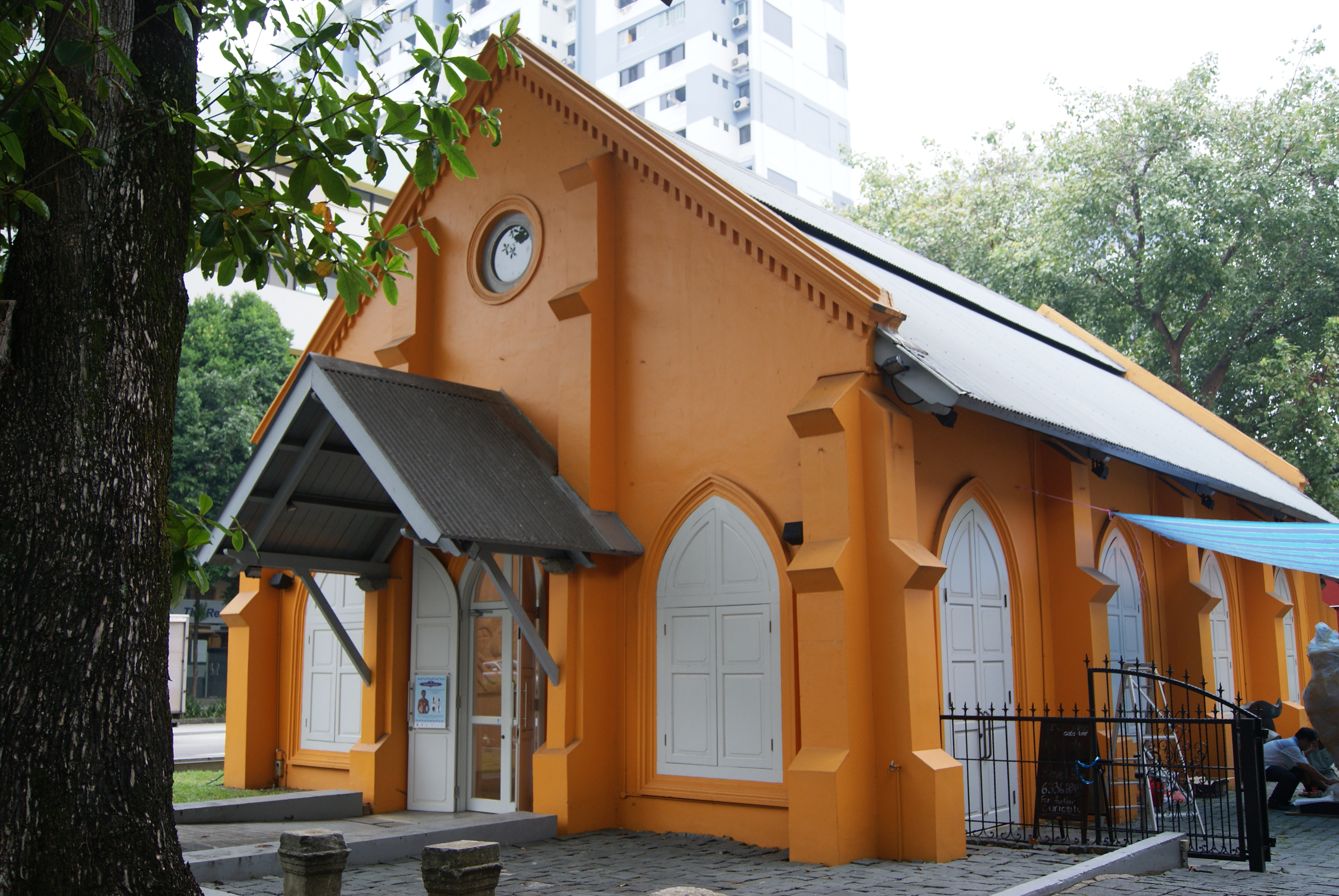
The Chapel, Sculpture Square

Sculpture Square was a non-profit arts organization located at 155 and 161 Middle Road, Singapore. It was founded by sculptor Sun Yu-Li in 1995 as a venue with the focus on exhibiting and fostering ‘3-dimensional’ and other forms of sculptural arts in Singapore.

The venue officially opened to the public in March 1999 with the exhibition Provocative Things: A Three Dimensional Experience in Singapore. The organization also often held annual ‘Sculpture Carnival’ events for the public, which was mainly targeted towards children and young adults in order to hone their interest in the arts.

Sculpture Square Ltd. vacated its premises in August 2014. Since its closure in 2014, the buildings have been occupied by another local arts organization, Objectifs - Centre for Photography and Film.

== Overview ==
=== Beginnings ===
During its hoarding by the Urban Redevelopment Authority, Sun Yu-Li, an architect turned sculptor, found interest in the former church building due to its ‘unique architectural features’. Sun had prior took notice of the premises whilst commuting to his former studio at Sophia Road. With the support of the National Arts Council, Sun was allocated the land with the proposal to set up a non-profit organization in support of the arts. Sun wanted Sculpture Square to be a “place for (Singapore’s) sculpture and other 3D arts to nourish and flourish”. With the help of his friend, Edmund Cheng, who was the deputy chairperson of Wing Tai Holdings, they managed to network the monetary support needed to back the funding for Sculpture Square. The total funding of more than $1.6 million for the repair works and development was contributed by the National Arts Council, as well as both public and private sectors.

=== Operations ===
Sculpture Square held its inaugural show, Provocative Things, during its official opening on 22 October 1999. The event proved to be highly anticipated by the Singapore arts community but had quickly dwindled in attention by the following year, causing Sun to authorize T. K. Sabapathy, a local art historian and curator, as senior curatorial advisor to aid with the promotion of the organization. Its following shows included Ghost: The Body at the Turn of the Century, orchestrated by Alan Oei in 2013.

Sculpture Square also held an annual Sculpture Carnival and Children's Sculpture Exhibition from 1999 up to 2012, one of the organization's longest running events. The event encouraged children aged 4 – 12 to create their own mini sculptures out of everyday materials to either be brought home or exhibited. The organization also briefly ran an artist-in-residency program that housed both foreign and local artists from 2003 to 2012 before being replaced in 2013 by a ‘Bureau’ program which allowed research and collaboration between multiple artists.

=== Closure ===
In August 2014, Sculpture Square left its building at 155, 161 Middle Road and was temporarily located at 48 Emerald Hill Road where they continued to provide art and curatorial consultancy. Its final exhibition was titled Postcards from the Future. The exhibition showcased postcards featuring the various sculptural works that had been exhibited in the past 15 years of operation- an ironic tribute as the three-dimensional works were paid homage in two-dimensional prints.

It was replaced by another organization funded under the National Arts Council's Art Housing Scheme, Objectifs - Centre for Photography and Film, which moved into the space in 2015.

According to its last chairman, Richard Helfer, the organization had agreed to vacate as they felt that "the accomplishment of our vision and mission is best served by not being venue-specific. Rather, (we feel) that the flexibility to work with different venues and organisations allows us to connect artists and their works better with a broader audience base".

Speculations have been made about dilution of public interest with regards to its closure. Located around the Bugis – Bras Basah district, the building is in proximity to many other larger art organizations such as Singapore Art Museum and National Design Centre, and art institutions such as Nanyang Academy of Fine Arts and LASALLE College of the Arts. This phenomenon could be possibly be the result of the government's increasing emphasis on the local arts industry. In 1995, the local authority came out with the goal of making Singapore into a "global city of the arts" by the year 2000 was further articulated by both the (then) Ministry of Information and the Arts (MITA) and Singapore Tourist Promotion Board. Buildings such as Esplanade, the Singapore Art Museum and the National Museum expansion, are all the results of that money invested in by the government during period to achieve the aim of making Singapore a regional hub, or a "global city for the arts."

The area is also home to some of Singapore's famous religious buildings like Kwan Im Thong Hood Cho Temple and the Sri Krishnan Temple along Waterloo Street. The rise of all these organizations in the civic district over the past decades could have caused the spread of public interest, as Sculpture Square was considerably smaller in scale.

=== Waterloo Street Arts Belt ===
Sculpture Square was a part of the Waterloo Street Arts Belt program under the National Arts Council's Arts Housing Scheme. Other buildings under the scheme are Selegie Arts Centre, Singapore Calligraphy Centre, Dance Ensemble Singapore, and Centre 42. This was part of the council's efforts to promote local arts in the civic district.

== Building ==
=== History ===
The organization's main gallery, the Chapel Gallery, was initially built as the Christian Institute by Charles Phillips in the 1870s. It was built mainly as a place to hold social activities within the church, as well as for the purpose of worship. The chapel housed the Middle Road Church, the Straits Chinese Community's first Methodist Church. The annex building was subsequently sold to the Women's Foreign Missionary Society (WFMS) and used as the Methodist Girls' School in 1891 before it relocated in 1901. In 1930, the Middle Road Church was relocated to Kampong Kapor and was then re-branded as the Kampong Kapor Methodist Church.

The building also functioned as a Chinese restaurant, May Blossom, during the Japanese Occupation in Singapore, and later, an automobile workshop, Sin Sin Motor Co, in the 1980s. The annex building served as the Continental Hotel, a backpacker's hotel. The premises were hoarded by the Urban Redevelopment Authority from 1995–1999 before the space was granted by the National Arts Council to Sun Yu-Li to operate as Sculpture Square.

=== Architecture ===
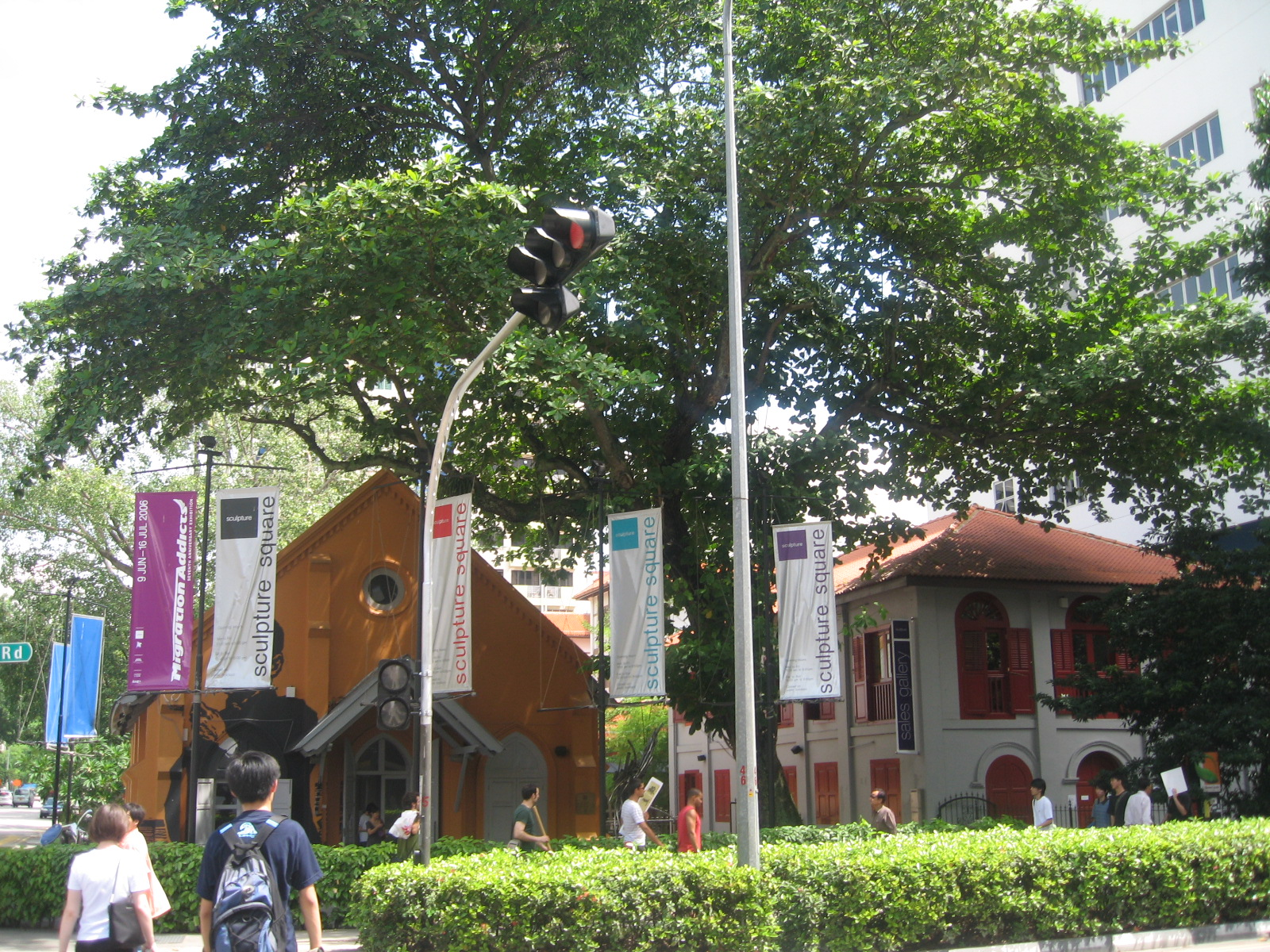
155 and 161 Middle Road

The Chapel Gallery was built with a gothic architectural style that resembles reproductions of English Parish Church. The chapel is 10 meters in height, with an open floor plan area of around 110 meters square. The high ceiling space has allowed the conducive facilitation of the placement of large and tall sculptures within the chapel gallery while the building was used as Sculpture Square. The exterior facades feature 5 large arch-shaped windows on each of the sides of the chapel. The front facing Middle Road features a main door flanked between two large windows. In the past, the second window on the sides from the front used to be a door that follows that of the main entrance, which was later converted into a window.

The windows of the church have pointed lancet arches that follows the style of gothic architecture. The front and back of the church facades also feature a rose window on each, which was then hollowed out during its period as Sculpture Square. Currently used by Objectifs, the hollowed rose windows were sealed off to cut off natural lighting, allowing the manipulation of interior lighting.

The building is one of the last remaining Gothic style buildings in Singapore. It was declared by the National Heritage Board as a historic site in 2000, in reference to its service as the Middle Road Church back in the 1890s.

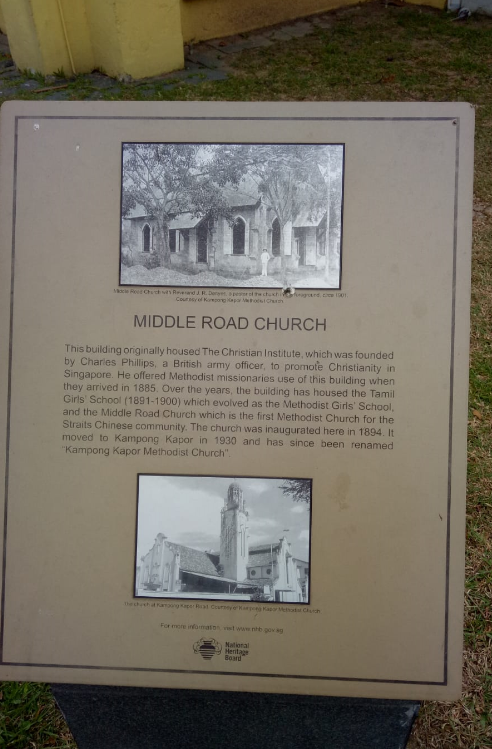
Plaque outside the building

=== Façade ===
Sculpture Square primarily featured an orange exterior paint job with white windows during its operation. However, the façade of the building was known to be occasionally painted over with mural arts, depending on the theme of the ongoing exhibition. One example is the Ghost: The Body at the Turn of the Century, where the exterior of the building was painted grey, with black graffiti marks to fit the theme.

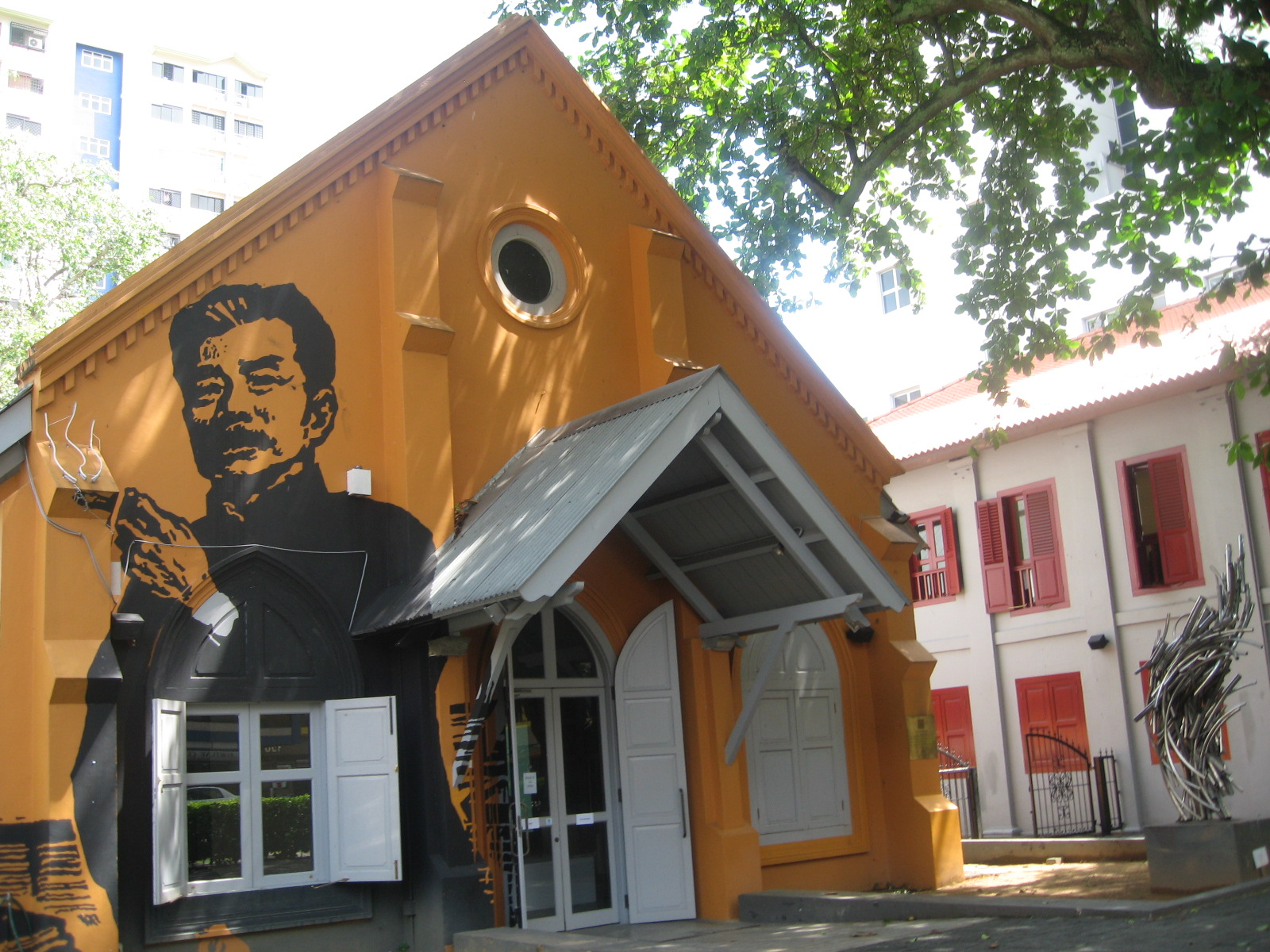
Building as art – mural painted on the facade of the chapel.

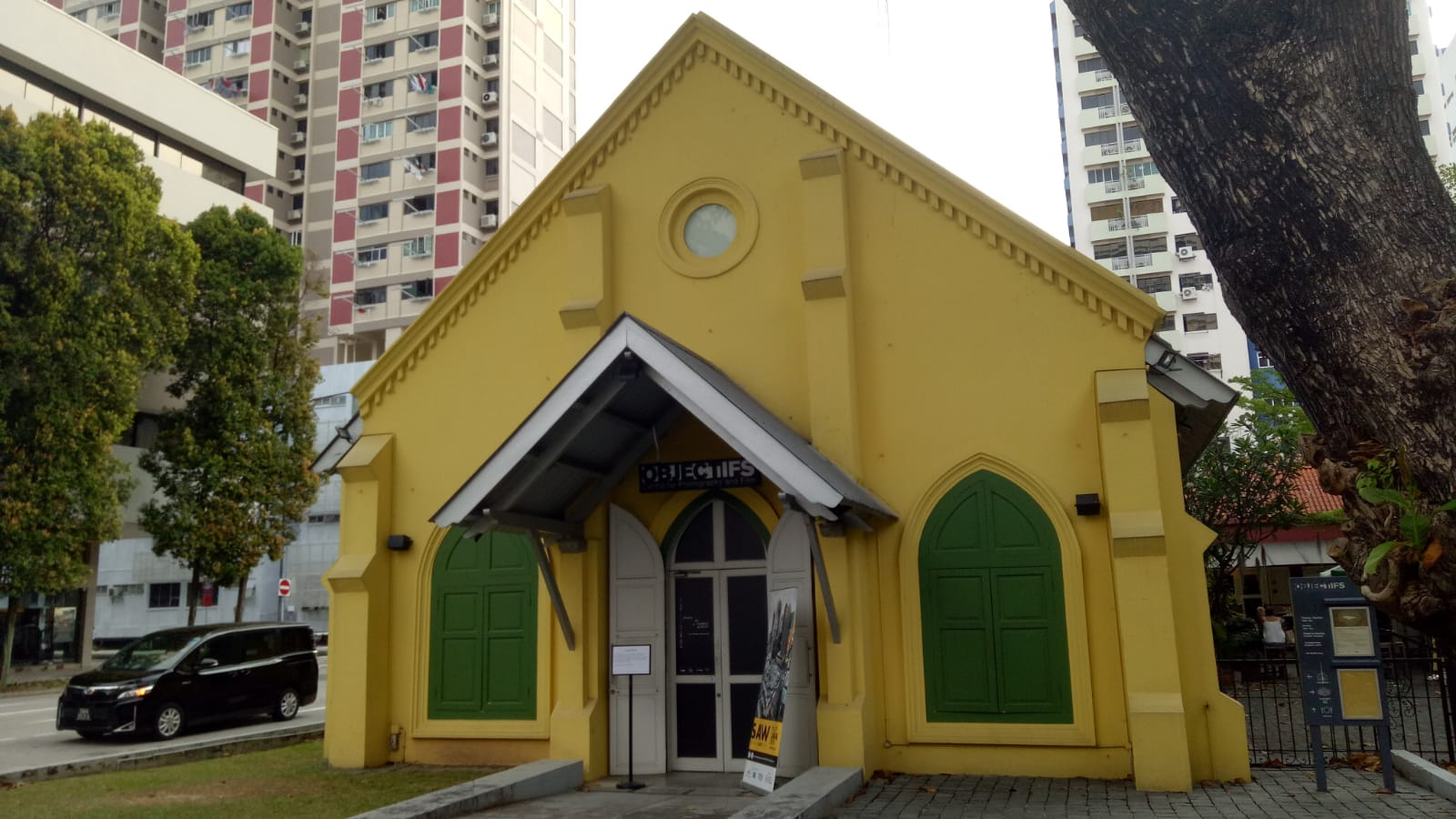
Current facade of the building

In the current modern context where the surrounding high-rise buildings overshadow other smaller buildings in the city-scape, the striking bright colours of Sculpture Square helped the building to stand out from its towering neighbors, a rare opportunity for a building to express itself in the city. Today, under the operation of Objectifs, the building is painted primarily in yellow with green windows, which is a reversion of colour scheme back to what it was commonly recognised by during the chapel's days as a motor workshop. Throughout the historical timeline of the chapel gallery, the external appearance, the interior and the chapel's surroundings changed in accordance to the function of the building. However, the physical architecture of the building is seemingly left untouched and retains the original gothic style when it was first built.

=== Urban development and planning ===
The location of Sculpture Square itself has been labelled under the NRA's masterplan in 1980 as a mixed used area. This provides an explanation as to why Sculpture Square's function as a building may change over a period of time – has no fixed plan for the building itself. Comparing to the most recent masterplan in 2014, the area has been labelled as a civic and community institution. The area surrounding 155 and 161 Middle Road has developed from an area that was predominantly mixed used and permanent residential areas, to an area with more high rise shopping and business buildings to suit the need of the modern era. Most of the buildings such as the Fortune Centre and the GSM buildings were old buildings renovated new, which allows the whole urban area to shed its historical atmosphere to become a more modern industrially developed place.

Analysing the visibility of Sculpture Square, its surrounding isovist spaces are limited by its neighbouring high rise buildings, hence limiting the Sculpture Square building to be seen from a wider visual field in the city. The space syntax of Sculpture Square could be improved by widening the partitions between the low rise buildings of Sculpture Square and the high rise buildings in order to retain its significance as a historical site to its place in the modern city.

== Historical timeline of the Chapel Gallery ==
=== Church chapel (1872–1875) ===
The building began as a church chapel in 1872, built by English missionary and British army officer Charles Phillips as the Christian Institute For Young Men in 1872, to promote Christianity in Singapore. The area was used to host social activities within the church for the community as well as for worship.

In 1875, Phillips invited the Methodists to use the place and transferred it to them in 1892.

=== Methodist Church / Straits Chinese Methodist Church (1894–1897) ===
In 1894, it became the first Methodist church in Singapore for the Straits Chinese community. It served mainly straits born or Baba Chinese with worship services conducted in Baba Malay. British Methodist missionary William Girdlestone Shellabear (1862–1947) was appointed as the church's first pastor. By 1897, the church's attendees had grown to almost 1,000, largely made up of children.

=== Tamil Girls' School / Methodist Girls' School (1898–1900) ===
From 1898 till 1900 the building operated as Tamil Girls' School, later Methodist Girls' School. A year later, the church bought over the building from the Methodist Girls' School. It exists as a school during the weekdays and leased to the Foochow Chinese Mission for their Sunday worship services.

=== Baba Malay Church (1901–1910) ===
The building was dedicated by the Bishop Warne of the Methodist Episcopal Church in 1901. By then, the church was popularly known as the Baba Malay Church.

Renovations were done to the building in 1899 and by 1901, the enlarged building was big enough to house multi-services in dialects like Hakka, Hokkien, Hinghua, Malay, Foochow and English.

=== Middle Road Church (1911–1929) ===
The church was renamed Middle Road Church in 1911. It Methodist-denomination Christian church that was renamed from the Malay Church, when its congregation consisted mainly of Peranakan-speaking Straits Chinese.

=== Kampong Kapor Methodist Church (1930-1940s) ===
In 1930 the building was sold to local tycoon Eu Tong Sen. At this time, the church was renamed Kampong Kapor Methodist Church.

=== May Blossom Chinese Restaurant (1942- ) ===
During the Japanese Occupation, the building operated as May Blossom Chinese Restaurant.

=== Sin Sin Motor Co (1980s-1990s) ===
The building was used the early 1980s as Sin Sin Motor Co, including a motor workshop and a carpark.

=== In flux (1990s-1998) ===
In 1993 the building was being allocated for arts groups as being part of NAC's Arts Housing Scheme appeared in Sep 1993. Since then they were set aside for arts groups. In 1995, 155 and 161 Middle Road had been allocated to Hi! Theatre, Singapore's pioneering theatre for the hearing impaired. Well-known theatre practitioner Roger Jenkins, who was founder and then artistic director of Hi! Theatre, recalled that the group had been in discussion in NAC and was exploring possibilities, but the costs of renovation had proved prohibitive.

155 Middle Road Building had retained its church appearance, but it was vacant and badly run down, as quoted by Sun Yu Li. The two-storied adjacent building, on the other hand, was painted in garish green and yellow and was used as a budget hotel known as Continental Hotel.

Sun also recalled that he saw the buildings being hoarded and with a sign by Urban Renewal Authority stating that the land was for sale.

=== Sculpture Square (1999–2014) ===
The building was converted into Sculpture Square, an Art Gallery in Singapore dedicated to the exhibition and promotion of three-dimensional art. Exhibitions were held monthly at the arts venue from its inauguration in March 1999. As for No. 161 of which the ground floor had been converted into a gallery space comprising a series of three-sided rooms that open up into a common passageway down the centre.

=== Objectifs Centre Ltd. (2014-) ===
From 2014 onward, the ownership was passed down to the Objectifs, which is a gallery for film and photography.
