= Bras Basah =

Coordinates: 1°17′49″N 103°51′11″E

- Subzone of Museum Planning Area

Name transcription(s)
  - Chinese: 百胜
  - Malay: Bras Basah
  - Tamil: பிராஸ் பாசா
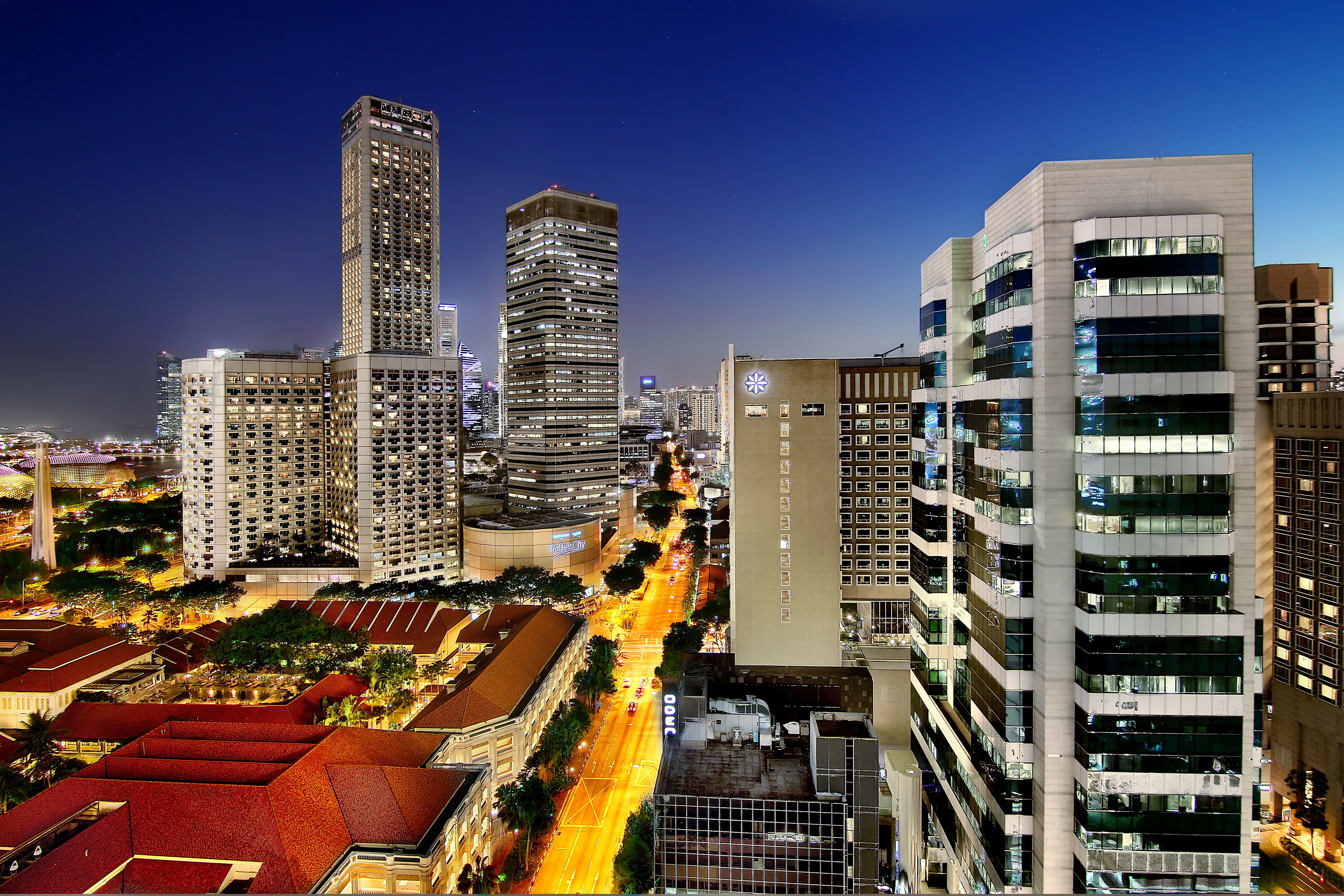
- An evening view of Bras Basah
- Interactive map of Bras Basah
- Country: Singapore

Bras Basah (/ˈbrɑːs ˌbɑːsɑː/, Chinese: 百胜, Tamil: பிராஸ் பாசா) is a district located in the Museum Planning Area of the Central Area of Singapore. Bras Basah (Modern Spelling: Beras Basah) means "wet rice" in Malay – beras means harvested rice with husk removed, and basah means wet.

The arts and heritage district in Singapore's civic centre, precinct houses several landmarks including Fairmont Singapore, Raffles Hotel, the Singapore Art Museum, the Cathedral of the Good Shepherd and Singapore Management University.

School of the Arts, Singapore (SOTA), Singapore's first specialised pre-tertiary art school, is also situated here. It was awarded Best Learning Building at the World Architecture Festival in 2010. Bras Basah MRT station, a Mass Rapid Transit (MRT) station on the Circle line (CCL), was awarded the "Best Transport Building" at the World Architecture Festival in 2009. Both the station and SOTA were designed by WOHA, a local firm. LASALLE College of the Arts and Nanyang Academy of Fine Arts (NAFA), which together make up the University of the Arts, are also situated here.

There are also numerous religious buildings throughout the area, including the Catholic Church of Saints Peter & Paul and the Jewish Maghain Aboth Synagogue across from each other and the Buddhist Kwan Im Thong Hood Cho Temple and the Hindu Sri Krishnan Temple beside each other.
