= Sir Manasseh Meyer International School =

International school in Singapore

Coordinates: 1°26′13″N 103°49′27″E

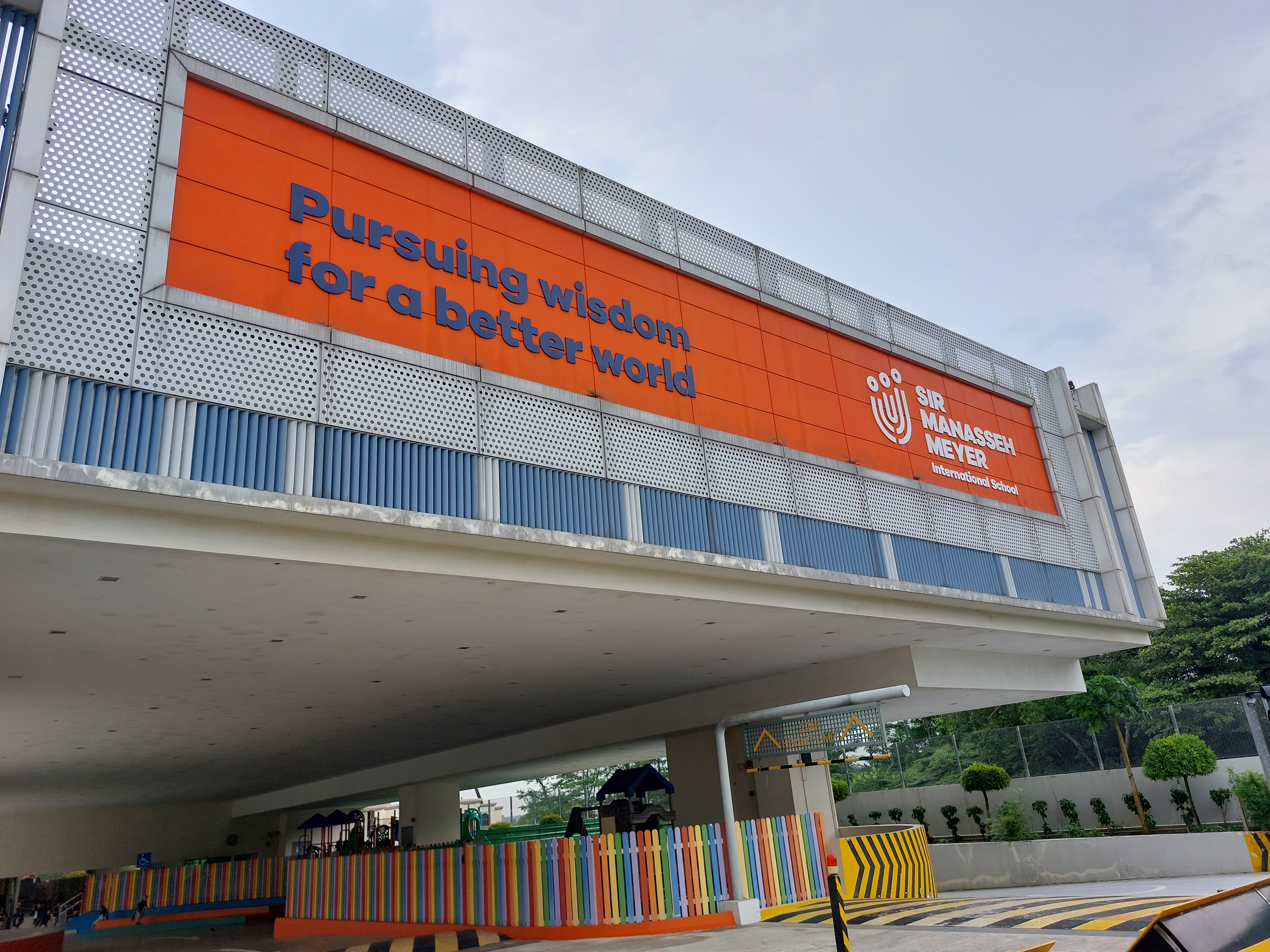
Sir Manasseh Meyer International School entrance

Sir Manasseh Meyer International School (SMMIS) is a not-for-profit international school in Singapore for children aged 2 to 16 years. The Sir Manasseh Meyer Trust supports the school with an annual grant.

== History ==
The school was originally founded in 1996 by Simcha Abergel as a nursery for young children, named "Ganenu Learning Centre" (Our Garden). Its original site was at Oxley Rise. In 2013 the school moved into a 170-capacity campus on Belvedere Close and grew into a community primary school. At this point it was renamed Manasseh Meyer School. In 2016, further expansion led to the move to a 450-capacity campus in Sembawang and a renaming of the school to Sir Manasseh Meyer International School.

The school has a strong Jewish ethos, and accepts students of all cultures and faiths.

== Academics ==
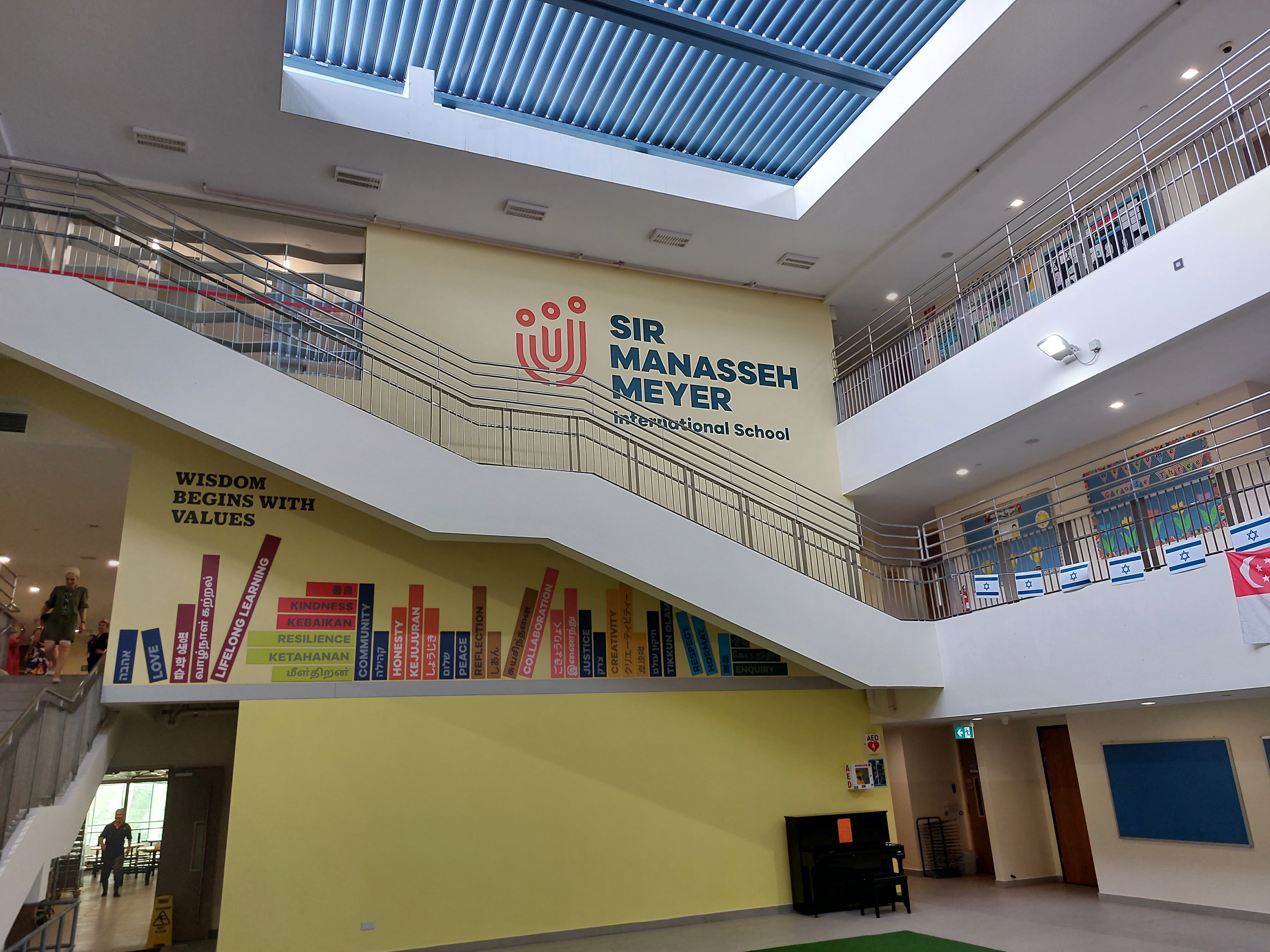
Sir Manasseh Meyer International School interior

The preschool is run with the Reggio Emilia approach. In primary school, literacy goals of the National Curriculum for England and Singapore math techniques are combined with the International Primary Curriculum (IPC). In secondary school the International Middle Years Curriculum (IMYC) is taught followed by the Cambridge iGCSE exam programme. There is a focus on STEAM education.

Mandarin and Hebrew are taught as modern foreign languages. SMMIS was accredited by EduTrust in 2020.

The Principal, since 2017, is Elaine Robinson.

== See also ==
- History of the Jews in Singapore
