= Chesed-El Synagogue =

Synagogue in River Valley, Singapore

- Hebrew: חסד-אל
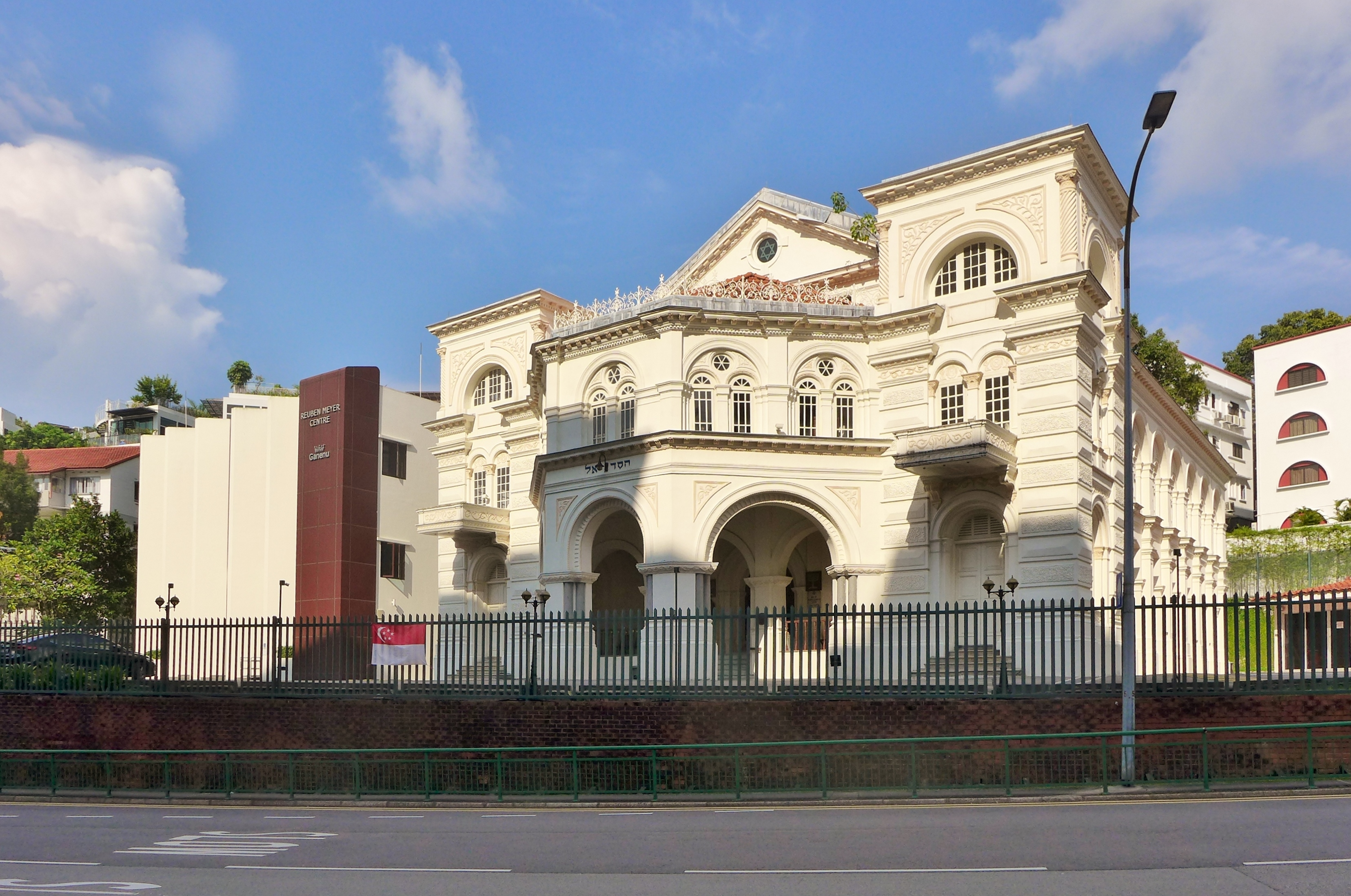
- The synagogue, in 2023

- Location of the synagogue in Singapore

Religion
- Affiliation: Judaism
- Rite: Sephardi
- Ecclesiastical or organizational status: Synagogue
- Leadership: Rabbi Nissim Zawady
- Year consecrated: 1905
- Status: Active

Location
- Location: Oxley Rise, River Valley, Central Area
- Country: Singapore
- Interactive map of Chesed-El Synagogue
- Coordinates: 1°17′50″N 103°50′33.2″E

Architecture
- Architect: Swan & Maclaren
- Type: Synagogue architecture
- Style: Renaissance Revival
- Funded by: Sir Manasseh Meyer
- Completed: 1905; 121 years ago

Website
- chesedel.org

National monument of Singapore
- Designated: 18 December 1998; 27 years ago
- Reference no.: 38

The Chesed-El Synagogue (Hebrew: חסד-אל, lit. 'Grace of God') is a Jewish congregation and synagogue, located at Oxley Rise, in River Valley, within the Central Area of Singapore. The synagogue was constructed in 1905 and in 1998 it was designated as a national monument of Singapore.

== History ==
The Chesed-El Synagogue was designated as a national monument on 18 December 1998.

The synagogue underwent an extensive renovation in 2016 with the support of the National Heritage Board (NHB) of Singapore. A Jewish Community Centre was built on the synagogue grounds, where the communal Sukkah used to stand. In 2019, the synagogue received its fourth grant from the restoration fund of the NHB for restoration and maintenance of the building.

== See also ==
- History of the Jews in Singapore
- List of synagogues in Singapore
