= Waterloo Street =

Road in Singapore

Coordinates: 1°17′54.407″N 103°51′7.762″E

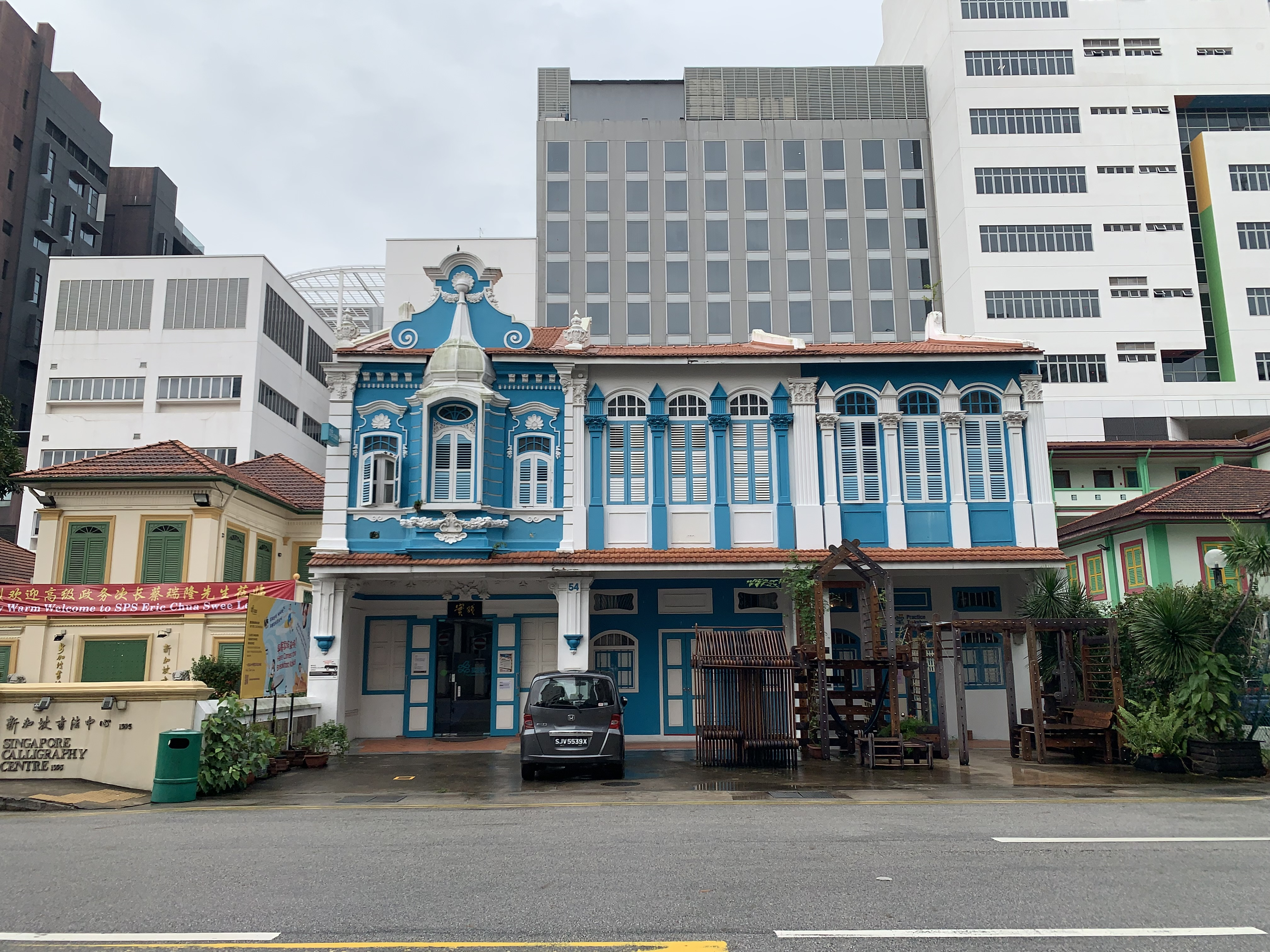
54-58 Waterloo Street

Waterloo Street (Note: Chinese: 滑铁卢街 or Chinese: 四马路. There is no official translation in Malay or Tamil, and the English name is retained in its original form in both languages.) is a two-way street located in the Central Area of Singapore, running from Rochor Road to Bras Basah Road. It traverses the planning areas of Rochor and Museum. Waterloo Street is home to a number of prominent landmarks, including the Kwan Im Thong Hood Cho Temple, the Maghain Aboth Synagogue, Sculpture Square and the Sri Krishnan Temple. The synagogue, established in 1878, is the oldest in Singapore and was built by the local Jewish community.

== History ==
Waterloo Street was originally established in 1837 and was initially named Church Street after Thomas Church, who served as Resident Councillor of Singapore at the time. In 1858, the Municipal Council renamed it Waterloo Street in honour of the Arthur Wellesley, 1st Duke of Wellington's victory at the Battle of Waterloo in 1815, as well as to avoid confusion as there was another Church Street close to Raffles Place.

In 1998, the northern end was redesigned as a pedestrian mall to alleviate vehicular congestion and accommodate the large crowds drawn to the Kwan Im Thong Hood Cho Temple, particularly on weekends and public holidays. On the southern end, the street formerly extended to Stamford Road but was shortened following the development of the Singapore Management University city campus in 2006 and the adjacent MRT station of Bras Basah which opened in 2010. Originally a one-way road, it was converted to a two-way street in 2016. In the lead-up to Chinese New Year, a small festive bazaar is typically held along the upper section of the street.

=== Naming ===
Waterloo Street was colloquially referred to as Si Beh Lor, meaning "Fourth Horse Carriageway", by the local Chinese community. This term reflected its place within a broader tradition of assigning Hokkien numerical nicknames to streets, making them easier for Chinese residents to identify and remember. It was preceded by North Bridge Road as "Toa Beh Lor" (First Horse Carriageway), Victoria Street as "Ji Beh Lor" (Second Horse Carriageway) and Queen Street as "Sa Beh Lor" (Third Horse Carriageway), and followed by Bencoolen Street as "Gor Beh Lor" (Fifth Horse Carriageway), Prinsep Street as "Lak Beh Lor" (Sixth Horse Carriageway) and Selegie Road as "Chit Beh Lor" (Seventh Horse Carriageway).

== Landmarks ==
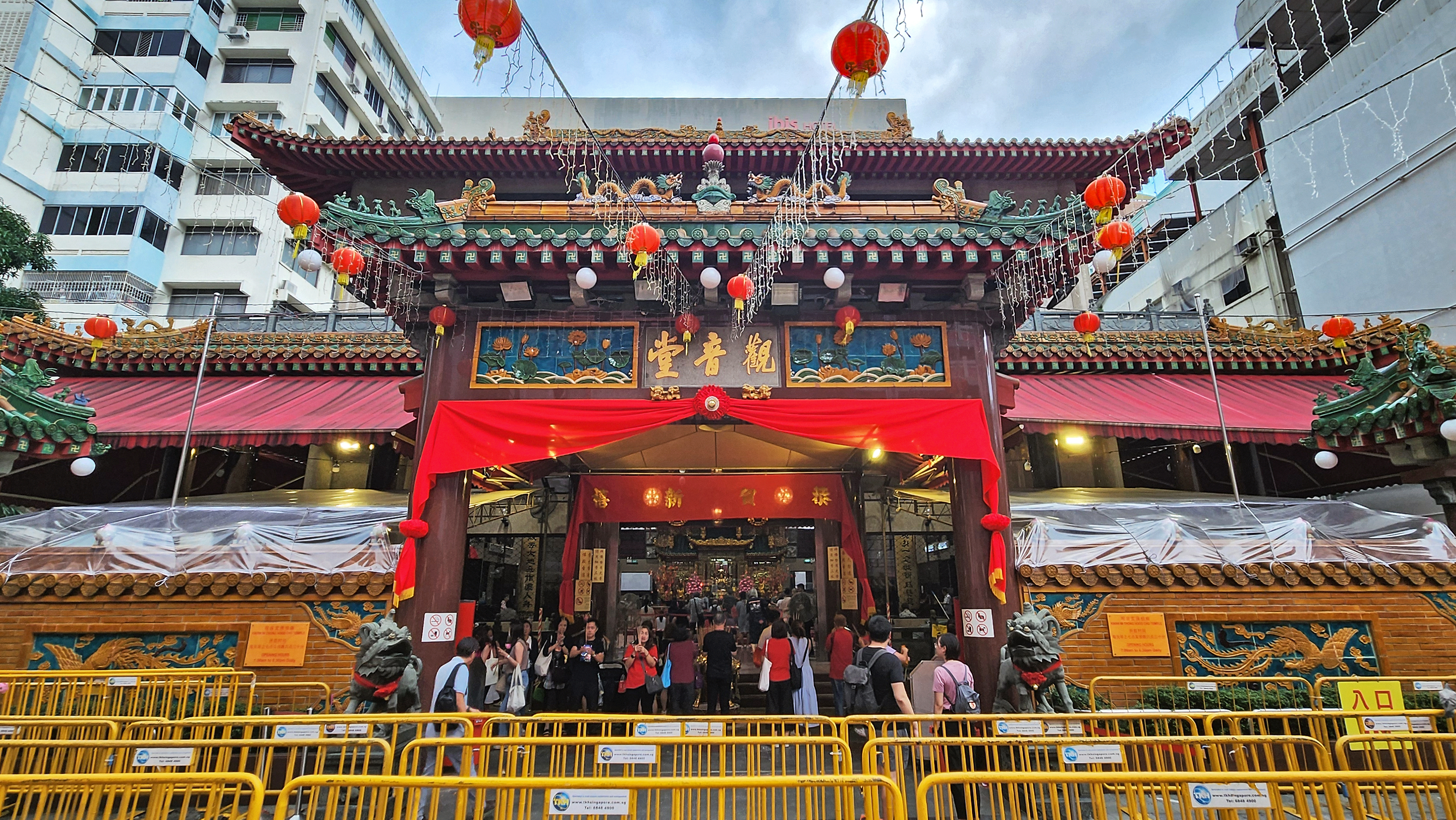
Kwan Im Thong Hood Cho Temple

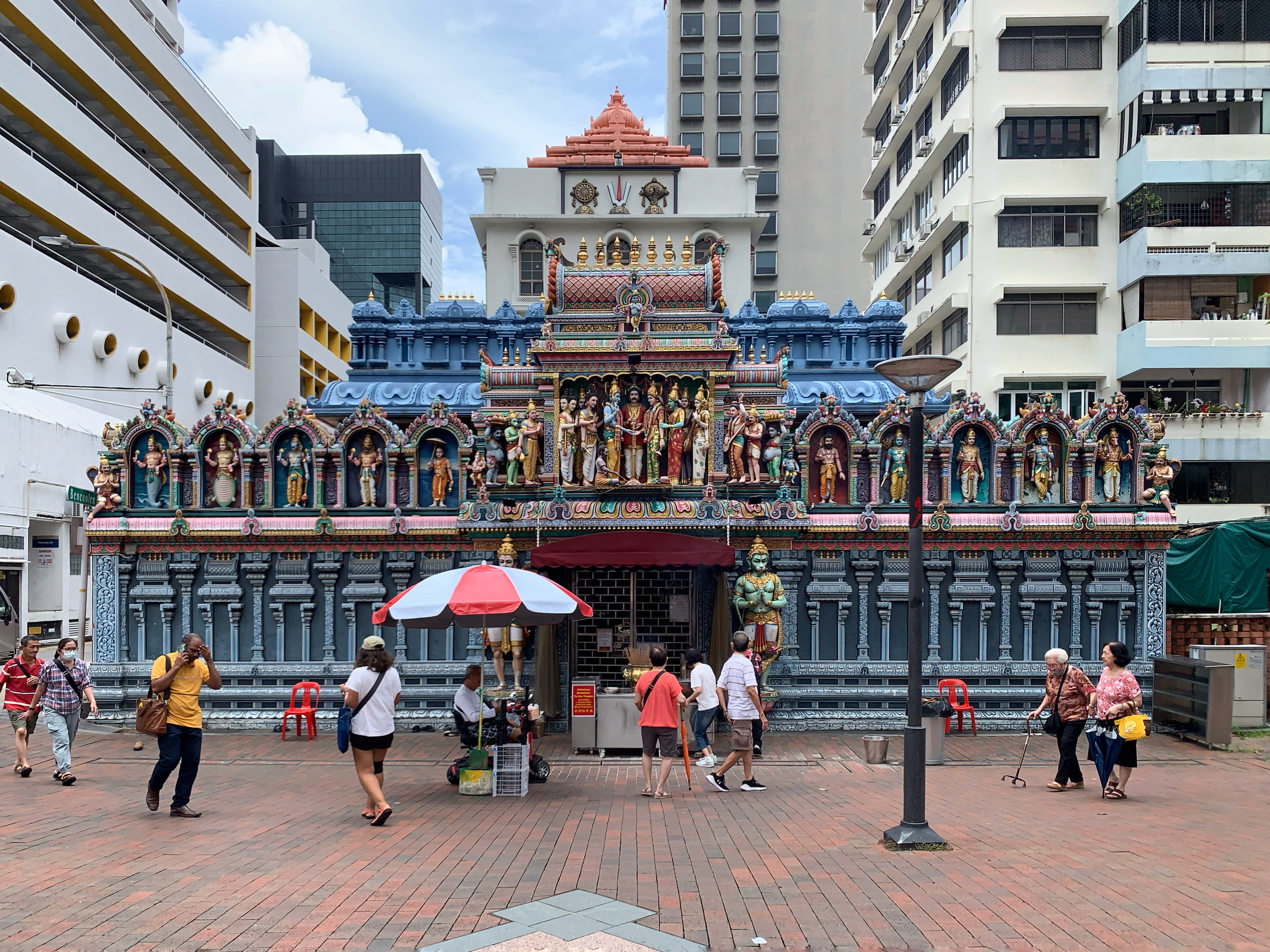
Sri Krishnan Temple

In order from Rochor Road to Bras Basah Road:

- OG Albert Complex
- The Bencoolen
- Fu Lu Shou Complex
- Albert Centre and Cheng Yan Court
- South East Asia Hotel
- Kwan Im Thong Hood Cho Temple
- Sri Krishnan Temple
- Stamford Arts Centre
- Fortune Centre
- Sculpture Square (Former Middle Road Church, which is now known as Kampong Kapor Methodist Church)
- Singapore Council of Women's Organisations Centre
- 60 Waterloo Street
- 54-58 Waterloo Street
- Singapore Calligraphy Centre
- 42 Waterloo Street
- Maghain Aboth Synagogue
- Jacob Ballas Centre
- Singapore Art Museum
- Plaza by the Park
