= Sri Krishnan Temple =

Hindu temple in Singapore

- ஸ்ரீ கிருஷ்ணன் கோயில் Srī kiruṣṇaṉ kōyil in Tamil
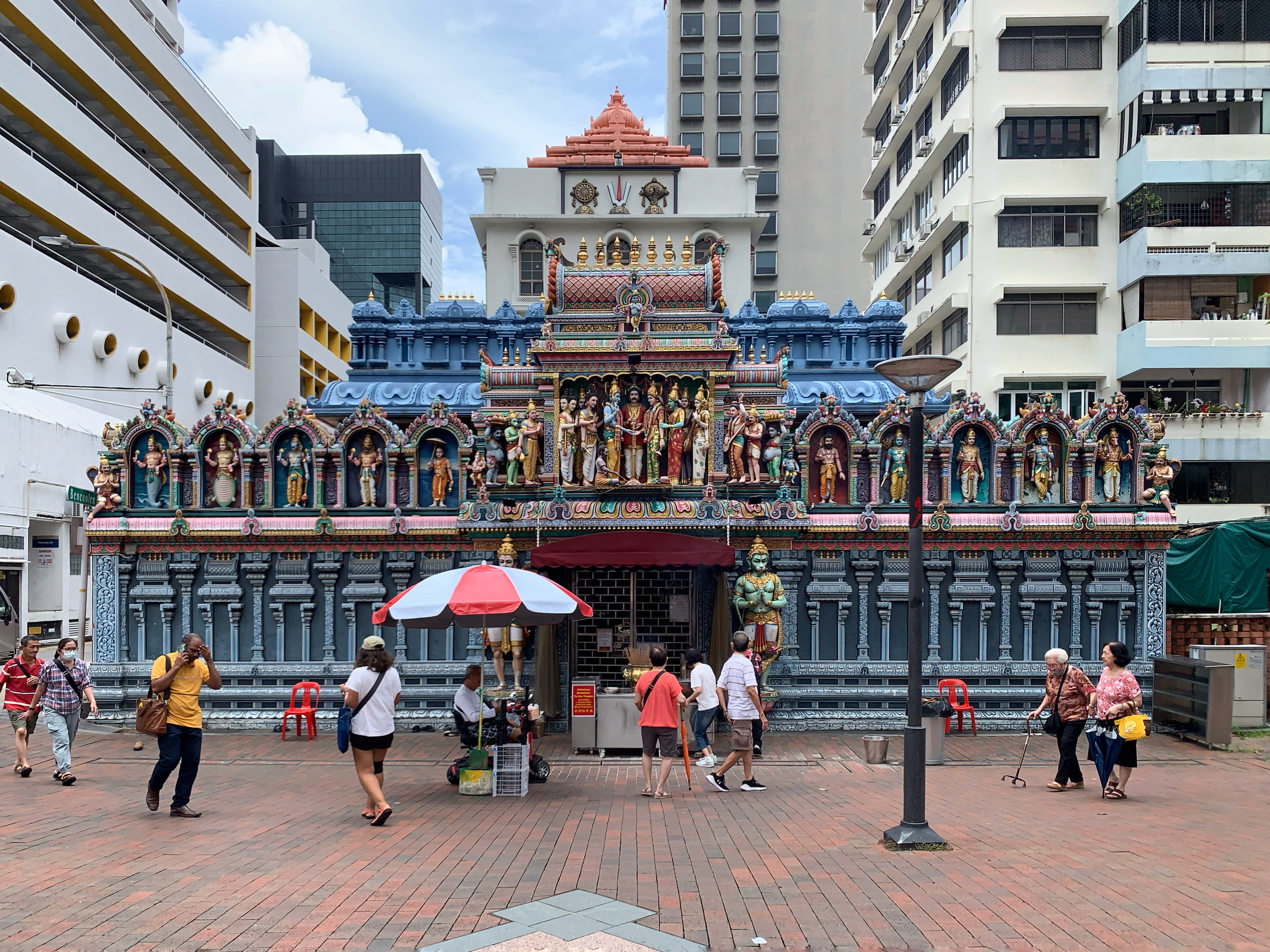
- Sri Krishnan Temple in 2025

- Location within Singapore

Religion
- Affiliation: Hinduism
- Deity: Krishna, Rukmini
- Governing body: Pakirisamy Sivaraman, Hindu Endowments Board

Location
- Location: Singapore
- Coordinates: 1.3005°N 103.8503°E

Architecture
- Style: Dravidian
- Creator: Hanuman Beem Singh
- Completed: 1870, rebuilt 1933
- National monument of Singapore
- Criteria: Historic, traditional, archaeological, architectural or artistic value
- Designated: 6 June 2014

Sri Krishnan Temple (Tamil: ஸ்ரீ கிருஷ்ணன் கோயில், transl. Srī kiruṣṇaṉ kōyil) is a Hindu temple in Singapore. Built in 1870 and gazetted as a national monument of Singapore in 2014, it is one of Singapore's oldest temples and is the only Tamil temple in Singapore dedicated to Krishna and his consort Rukmini. The Sri Krishnan Temple and the nearby Kwan Im Thong Hood Cho Temple are known for having evolved a social practice termed "cross-worshipping", where many devotees of either temple also worship at the other. This practice is commonly seen as a microcosm of Singapore's multi-religious society.

== History ==
The temple began as a shrine laid in 1870 by a Hindu immigrant, Hanuman Beem Singh, a wealthy merchant who had been deported to Singapore by the British administration in India. By that time, a large Hindu community had formed within the bounds of Bras Basah Road, Victoria Street and Albert Street. In response to their religious needs, Singh placed the images of the Hindu deities Vigneshwar and Krishna at the foot of a banyan tree and began praying to it regularly. As it became a popular site of worship, he built a platform to hold Krishna's image. Singh managed the temple until 1880, when he became too old to do so. He then handed over responsibility to his son, Humna Somapah, who managed it until 1904.

In 1904, management of the temple passed to Somapah's niece, Joognee Ammal. In 1933, Ammal had the main shrine built and consecrated, using donations from the prominent brothers Naraina Pillai and Pakirisamy Pillai. Ammal passed on responsibility for the temple to Pakirisamy in 1934, and he remained in this role until his passing in 1984. After that, this role passed to his son, Sivaraman, who remains Chairman of the temple today. After taking over, Sivaraman sponsored an extensive renovation between 1985 and 1989, and the temple was reconsecrated in a Mahakumbhabhishekham ceremony in November 1989, attended by the Minister for Community Development and Foreign Affairs Wong Kan Seng. On 6 June 2014, the temple's gopuram, mandapa and boundary walls were gazetted for conservation as a national monument of Singapore. The temple was renovated again in 2002, and thereafter between 2016 and 2018, at a cost of S$4 million. It was reconsecrated in 2018 at a 48-day long Mahakumbabishekham ceremony, attended by S. Iswaran, Edwin Tong and Denise Phua and an estimated 10,000 devotees.

== Location and practices ==
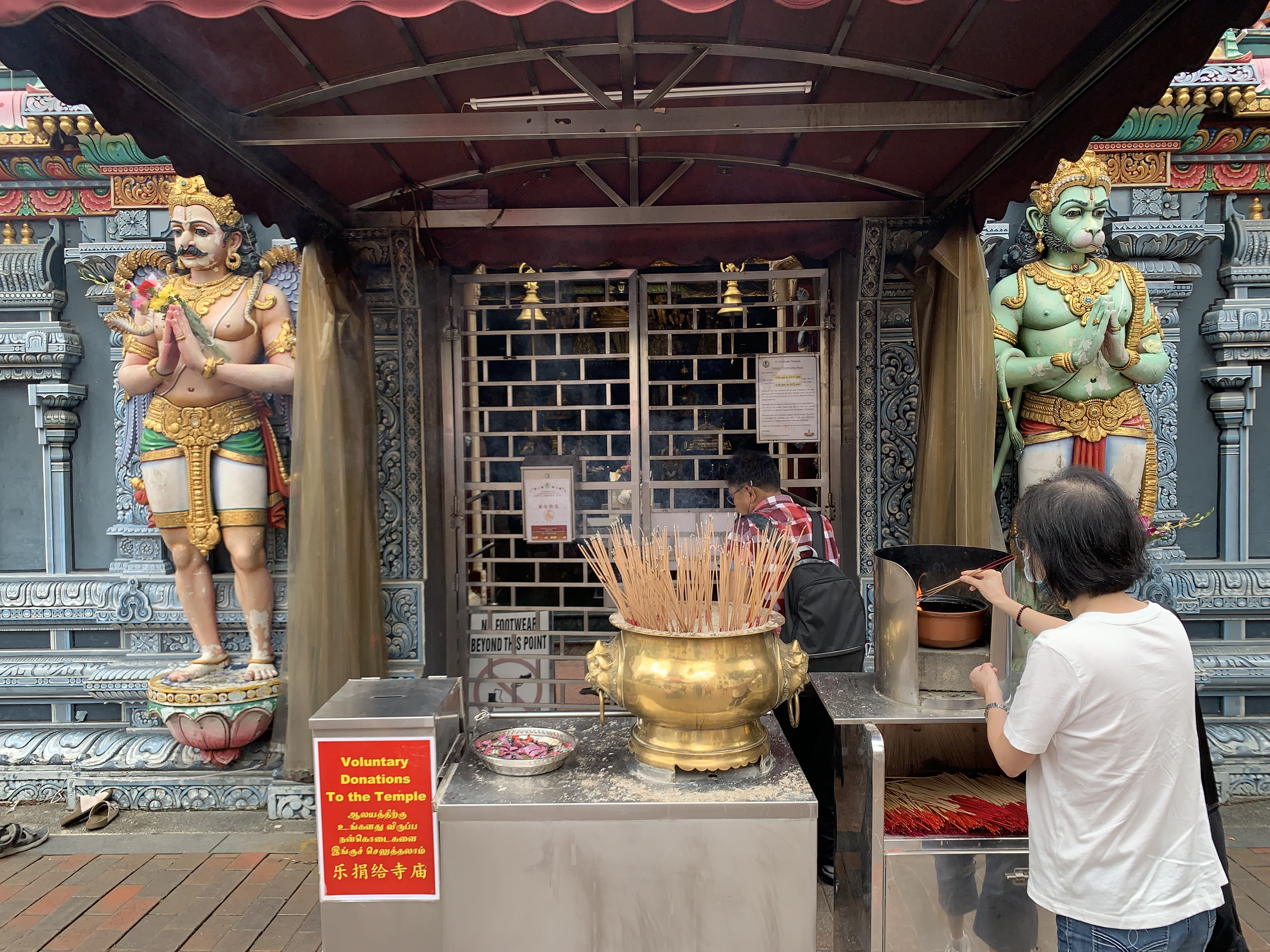
A devotee making Chinese-style incense sticks offering that are provided by the temple

The temple is known for its celebrations of Deepavali and Krishna Jayanthi. It is located on Waterloo Street, next to the Kwan Im Thong Hood Cho Temple, and near a Methodist chapel and the Maghain Aboth Synagogue. It is re-sanctified every 12 to 15 years.

Over time, a practice of cross-worshipping has evolved between devotees of the Sri Krishnan Temple and the Kwan Im Thong Hood Cho Temple. Both temples are affiliated with polytheistic religions: Hinduism and the Chinese folk religion. It is not clear when this practice started, but it was limited to a small number of people in the early-to-mid 1980s, when Sivaraman placed a small urn at the entrance for Chinese worshippers to place their joss sticks. In the late 1980s, a seller of Hainanese chicken rice donated a larger urn, worth approximately S$1,000, to hold the joss sticks. The urn is inscribed with the words "Waterloo Chicken Rice" and remains in use today. Some time later, the temple administration has added a statue of Guanyin inside their temple, and designated a zone within the temple compound for Buddhist worshippers to offer joss sticks. In 2017, the number of Chinese worshippers at the Sri Krishnan Temple was estimated at 100 per day, increasing to 400 a day on weekends, and peaking at 1,000 on the first day and the 15th day of every lunar month. This practice been described as a reflection of the distinct regional identity unique to diaspora communities such as Singapore's, and has been observed in other space-constrained diaspora communities such as George Town, in Penang.

== Layout ==
The temple was built over time, in the classical Dravidian architectural style, and in accordance with the Agama Sastra. It has been described as having a "sturdy" look and design, with multiple pilasters and cornices. In the 1970s, it remained undamaged in a fire which broke out in the vicinity of the temple, burning down all the nearby attap houses.

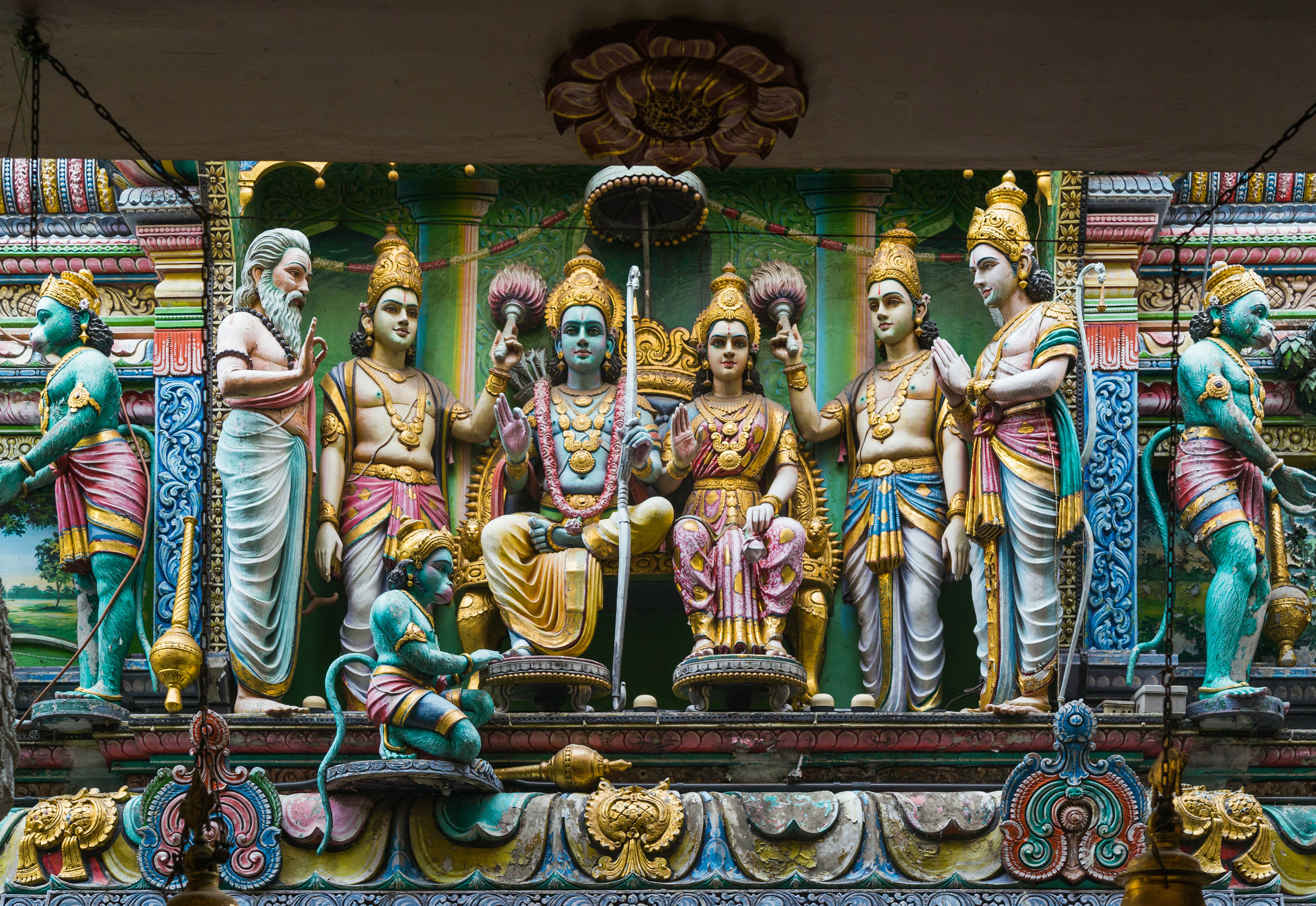
An altar to the Hindu god Rama at the Sri Krishnan Temple

The full compound spans 1,008 square metres (10,850 sq ft) and contains a mandapa of 220 square metres (2,400 sq ft), with a vimana, or dome, directly over the garbhagriha, or inner sanctum. The temple hall features a skylight, enabling worshippers to look upwards and see the dome from within the mandapa. It is complemented by an annexe building of 788 square metres (8,480 sq ft) in size, containing a basement of multi-purpose rooms. The main shrine is made of pebbles and granite. The vimana is the tallest point of the temple, at a height of approximately 8 metres (26 ft). It is decorated with statues of deities, as well as with designs in copper and gold plating.

The second tallest point of the temple is the gopuram (or gateway tower), one of the gazetted features of the temple. It is decorated with statues studded with semi-precious stones depicting the wedding scene of Padmavathi and Srinivasar, presided over by the local king, Aksaraja, and in the presence of the gods Siva, Brahma and their consorts. On the sides of the gopuram are statues of Garuda and Anjaneyar, the vanara companion of the god Rama. The exterior is decorated with statues of the dashavatara (the ten major incarnations of the Hindu god Vishnu), Garuda, and a wedding scene. In the renovation completed in 2018, eight concrete shrines were replaced with onyx sanctums to improve durability, in view of a decreasing number of temple artists. The same renovation saw the upgrade of the shrines, pillars, ceiling and temple dome.
