= Maghain Aboth Synagogue =

Synagogue in Rochor, Singapore

- Malay: Sinagog Maghain Aboth; Chinese: 马海阿贝犹太庙; Hebrew: מגן אבות
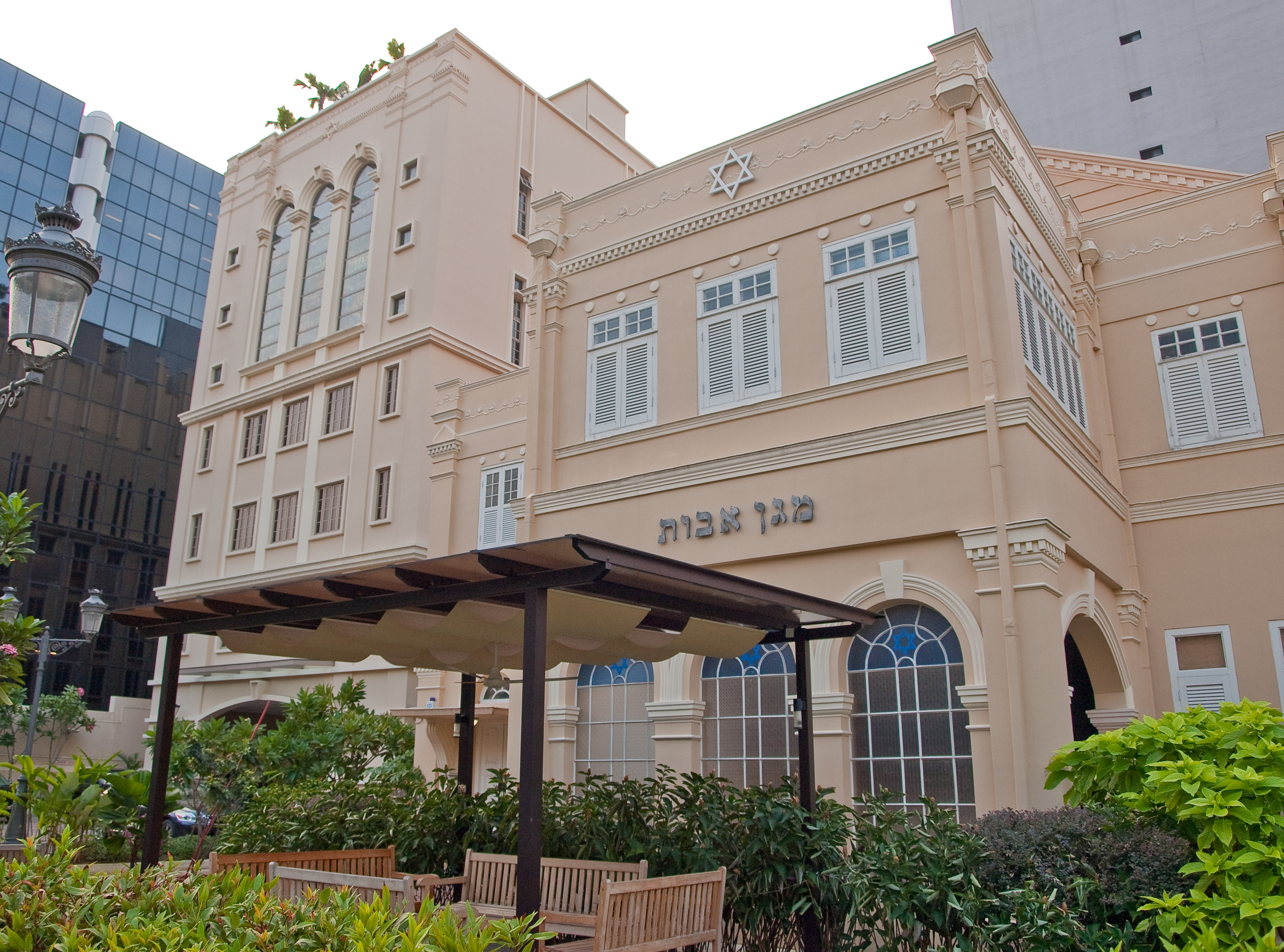
- The synagogue, in 2010

- Location of the synagogue in Singapore

Religion
- Affiliation: Judaism
- Ecclesiastical or organisational status: Synagogue
- Leadership: Rabbi Mordehai Abergel
- Year consecrated: 1878
- Status: Active

Location
- Location: 24/26 Waterloo Street, Rochor, Central Area, 187968
- Country: Singapore
- Administration: Jewish Welfare Board
- Coordinates: 1.29825°N 103.85070°E

Architecture
- Type: Synagogue architecture
- Style: Neoclassical; Colonial
- Funded by: Sir Manasseh Meyer
- Established: c. 1840 (as a congregation)
- Completed: 1878; 148 years ago
- Direction of façade: West

Website
- singaporejews.com

National monument of Singapore
- Designated: 27 February 1998; 28 years ago
- Reference no.: 35

The Maghain Aboth Synagogue (Note: Malay: Sinagog Maghain Aboth; Chinese: 马海阿贝犹太庙; Hebrew: מגן אבות, romanized: Ma'gen Ahvot, lit. 'Guardian of Patriarchs' or 'Shield of our Fathers') is a Hasidic Jewish congregation and synagogue, located at 24/26 Waterloo Street in Rochor, within the Central Area of Singapore. Constructed in 1878, it is the oldest and largest Jewish synagogue in Southeast Asia and the second largest in Asia itself, outside of Israel.

Managed by the Jewish Welfare Board, it remains to be the main place of worship for the Jewish community in Singapore. It was designated as a national monument of Singapore in 1998. Today, the synagogue and its surroundings has served as the unofficial centre of Jewish activity in Singapore, with several Jewish buildings standing within its vicinity, including a kosher supermarket and a museum.

== History ==
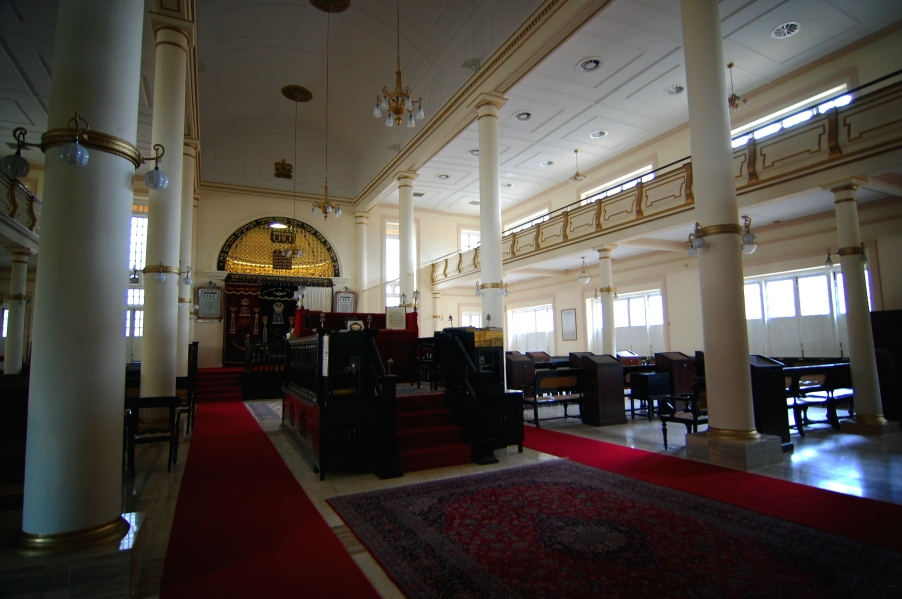
Interior of Maghain Aboth Synagogue

=== Early years ===
As early as 1831, Singapore's earliest Jewish settlers were Mizrahi/Sephardic merchants from mainly modern-day Iraq and Iran who came to trade.

In 1870, one of the synagogue's new trustees, Joseph Joshua, negotiated to buy a plot of land owned by Raffles Institution at Bras Basah for $4,000 in order to build a new synagogue. However, not enough funds were raised to build the new synagogue within the 3-years period agreement.

=== Construction ===
Construction of Maghain Aboth began after the land was acquired and was completed in 1878. In 1893, a U-shaped balcony was added to form the second-storey of the building with the purpose of accommodating the female members of the community.

Later in 1924 to 1925, extensions were made to the building and a more solid and permanent gallery was built. The synagogue started to hold a congregation of approximately 40 and served the local Jewish community for 30 years before it was sold. The building was later demolished after World War II. However, parts of the original building remains in use in the present.

=== Japanese occupation ===
During the Japanese Occupation of Singapore, the synagogue was a significant gathering place for the local Jews to exchange news and collect funds to help those in need. In the past, oil lamps were used during services and they still remain in the present day, hanging from steel rods in loving memory of those who have passed on. The Maghain Aboth Synagogue was gazetted as a national monument later on 27 February 1998.

=== Contemporary era ===
In 2007, a seven-storey building called the Jacob Ballas Centre was added to the compound next to the Maghain Aboth Synagogue. It was named after the late Jacob Ballas who was seen as a pillar of the Jewish community in Singapore. The centre provides facilities to meet the needs of the Jewish community such as offices and homes for the Rabbis and the Yeshivah boys, a women's mikvah, a slaughter room for kosher chickens, a kosher restaurant, a kosher shop and a social hall for events and functions including Shabbat and festival meals. Descendants of most of the earliest Jewish settlers in the country are today Singaporean citizens.

In March 2021, the Internal Security Department (ISD) reported that it had detained a 20-year old national serviceman, Amirull Ali, in February under the Internal Security Act (ISA) for plotting to attack three Jewish worshippers at the Maghain Aboth Synagogue. Ali was motivated by sympathy towards the Palestinians and believed that these three men had served in the Israel Defense Forces (IDF) and committed atrocities against the Palestinians. He also reportedly planned to travel to Gaza to join Hamas' military wing, the Izz ad-Din al-Qassam Brigades.

==== The Jews of Singapore Museum ====
On 2 December 2021, The Jews of Singapore Museum opened its doors beside the synagogue at the Jacob Ballas Centre, which traces the history of the Jews in Singapore and the contributions notable Jews have made to Singaporean society.

== Architecture ==
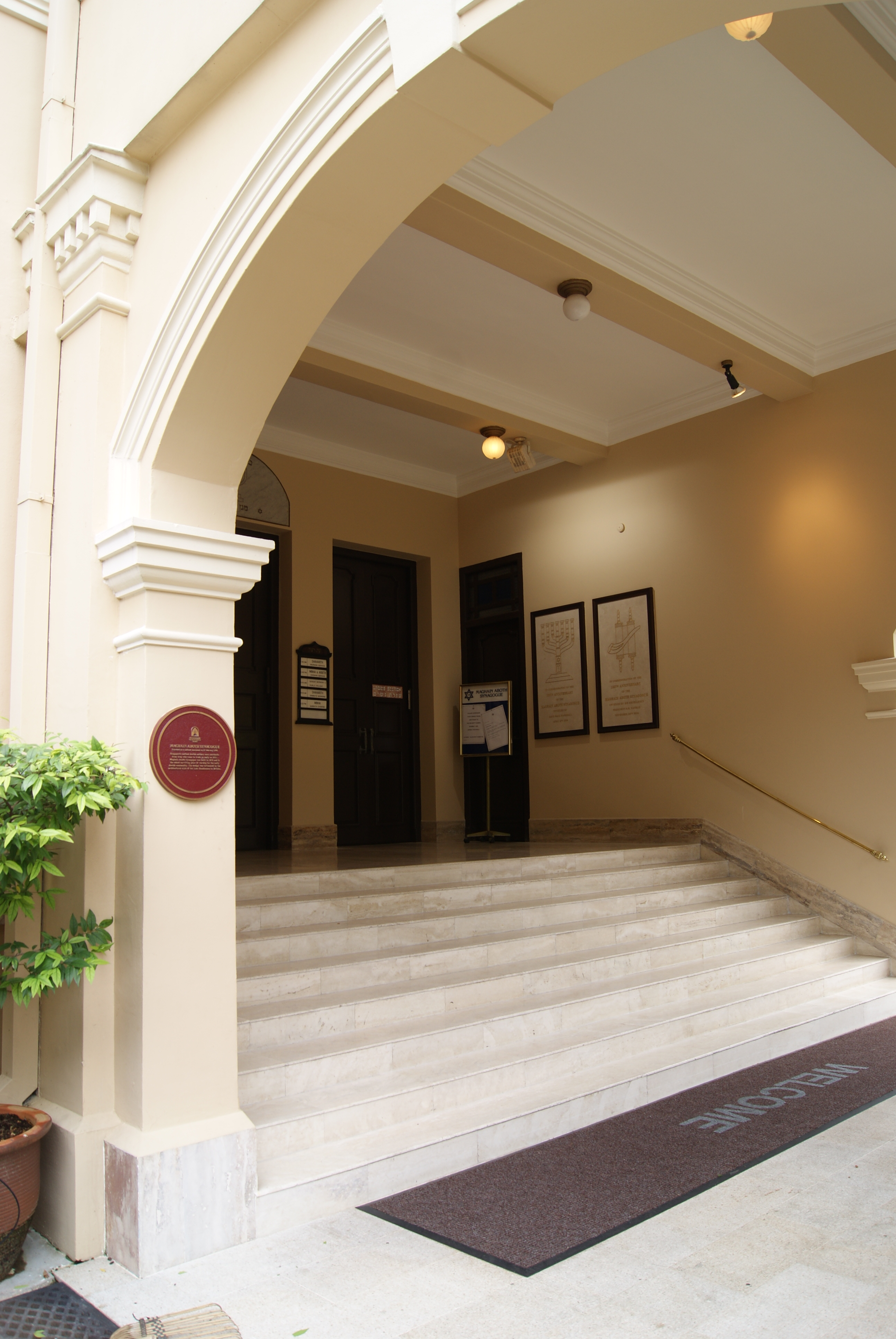
Maghain Aboth Synagogue's Porch

As Jewish men and women worship separately in a synagogue, the synagogue's original single-storey building could only accommodate men.

The U-shaped second-storey balcony was originally made up wooden slats of makeshift nature which the women were able to see through very clearly. Therefore, the original simple design was deemed inadequate and thus, later constructed to be a solid gallery which was added to the main building which remains in use today.

The synagogue is a symmetrical building which has adopted a neo-classical style and colonial architecture. The design of the building was influenced by the Late Renaissance architectural style in Britain. The building has a repetitive sequence of Palladian arcades and pedestals and within the building, the hall has traditional Roman columns and rusticated walls which is bare of any decoration or image. Along the corners and sides of the building are pilasters topped with decorative capitals. The synagogue's doorways are also adorned with arches with classical keystone architecture. A covered porch fronts the building with steps leading up to the vestibule originally designed for horse carriages.

Most of the windows are of a similar rectangular design and are timber-louvred. The windows are an important feature of a synagogue because based on the Talmud, Jewish synagogues are required to have windows. Despite the deliberate simple design of the synagogue, the building still remains to be elegant due to the combination of its timber-louvred windows, marble floors and red carpets with teak and rattan pews.

The prayer hall is facing west towards Jerusalem and the bimah, an elevated platform in the centre, faces the alcove known as the 'hekhal', which is used to store the Torah scrolls, that is at the West wall of the hall. The parochet which is an embroidered fringed curtain that is rich in details is used to cover the Torah ark. In front of it hangs the sanctuary lamp which signifies the eternal flame that burned in the former Temple of Jerusalem.

== See also ==
- History of the Jews in Singapore
- List of synagogues in Singapore
