= History of the Jews in Singapore =

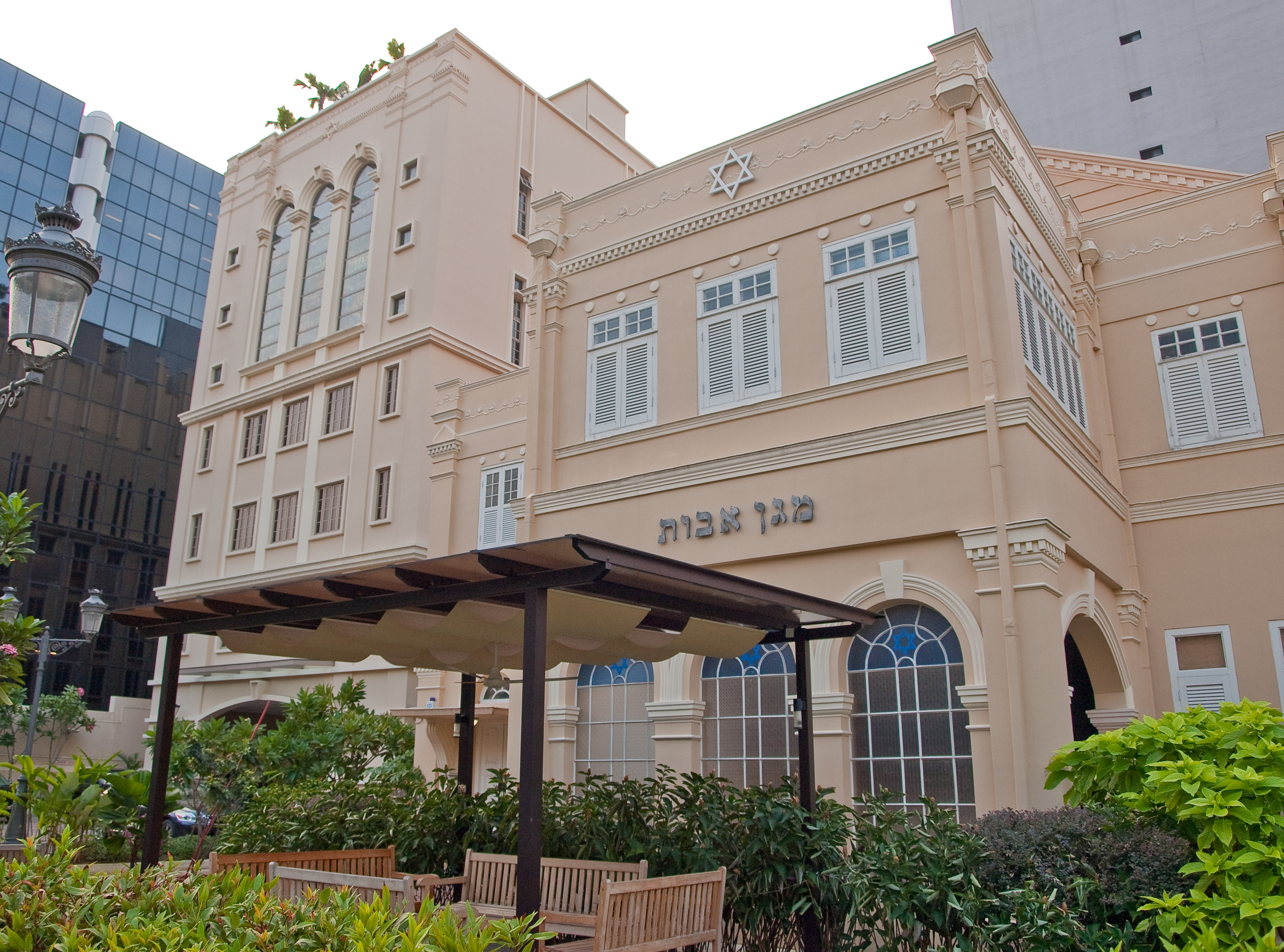
Maghain Aboth Synagogue

The history of the Jews in Singapore dates back to the 19th century. Jews are currently a significant minority population in the country. Singaporean Jews or Jewish Singaporeans are citizens who are Jewish, whether by culture, ethnicity, or religion. Uniquely, Singapore is the only country in Southeast Asia to have indigenous Jews.

== History ==
=== Colonial era ===
The first wave of Jewish immigration to Singapore were Jews of Baghdadi origin. The migration of Baghdadi trade diaspora occurred during the 18th and 19th centuries and was at its peak in 1817 due to the rule of Ottoman governor Dawud Pasha of Baghdad, who persecuted Jews during his 15-year rule. The first Jews to live in Singapore were the Baghdadi traders who were trading between the then-British ports of Calcutta and Singapore. These settlers spoke Arabic and after arriving in Singapore, adopted the Malay language, then the main language used in Singapore. Approximately 180 descendants of these Jews still exist, which the Rabbi of Singapore, Rabbi Mordechai Abergel, described as the only remaining indigenous Jews of South-east Asia.

In 1841, three Jews, Joseph Dwek Cohen, Nassim Joseph Ezra and Ezra Ezekiel were given a land lease to build a synagogue in a small shop house at Boat Quay. The synagogue was the inspiration of the name of Synagogue Street.

Synagogue Street was in the first Jewish quarter in Singapore, bordered by Wilkie Road, Mount Sophia Road, Bras Basah Road and Middle Road, which the Jewish called "mahallah" (meaning ‘place’ in Arabic); it was the gathering place for the Jewish community in Singapore. The local Jewish community also had a minhag that allowed for travelling to synagogue on Shabbat via rickshaw.

When Manasseh Meyer returned to Singapore in 1873, he found the synagogue in Synagogue Street in a deplorable state and set about planning a new one for the Jewish community. Jewish community leaders sold off the old synagogue to the government and bought new land for a new synagogue along Waterloo Street, then called Church Street because of the presence of the Church of Saint Peter and Saint Paul nearby. The Jewish community soon began moving into the surrounding areas of Dhoby Ghaut, Waterloo Street, Prinsep Street, Selegie Road and Wilkie Road. Today, several Jewish buildings still exist in the area.

Construction of Maghain Aboth Synagogue, began soon after the community was given the land, and was completed in 1878. A well was sunk for use as a mikvah (ritual bath). The consecration service was held on 4 April 1878 and conducted by either Lucunas or I. J. Hayeem or both men. In 1924, extensions were made to the building.

Over the years, as Jewish immigration to Singapore increased, the Maghain Aboth Synagogue began to become overcrowded during services. Because of friction between the Sephardic and Ashkenazi communities over how the services should be conducted, Sir Manasseh Meyer decided to build a new synagogue, Chesed-El Synagogue, completed in 1905.

By 1931, the population had grown to 832, according to a census record that the 832 Jews and a larger number of Arab residents were the largest house property owners in the city.

=== Japanese occupation ===
By 1942, the same year Japanese occupation of Singapore started, the Jewish population had grown to a high of 1,500. During the occupation, many Jewish settlers were taken to POW camps located at Changi Prison and Sime Road. In the camp, the Jewish settlers were allowed to keep a kosher kitchen.

=== Post-war ===
After World War II ended, there was an exodus of Jews to Israel and Western countries such as Australia, the United Kingdom, and the United States. As a result, the community dropped to approximately 450 in 1968, even falling as low as 180 sometime in the 1960s.

=== Recent history ===
From the late 1980s, the Jewish community started growing due to increased economic development and a large Ashkenazi immigration rate to Singapore. As of 2019, there were approximately 2500 Jewish residents in Singapore.

== Demographics ==
As of 2015, there are 10,456 Jews in Singapore. Approximately 180 descendants of the "first wave" Jews, who are mostly Orthodox and began arriving almost 200 years ago, still exist, which the Rabbi of Singapore, Rabbi Mordechai Abergel, described as the only remaining indigenous Jews of Southeast Asia.

== Notable people ==
=== David Marshall ===
One of the most well-known Jews in the history of Singapore was David Marshall (1908–1995). He was the first chief minister of Singapore in 1955, serving for 14 months while being the leader of the Labour Front. He also led the first Merdeka Talks to London in hopes of gaining independence from the British but resigned after failing. Following his resignation in 1957, he founded the Workers Party of Singapore, which is currently Singapore's second largest political party.

In his later life, he served as Singapore's ambassador to France, Switzerland, Spain, and Portugal. He died in 1995 of lung cancer.

=== Sir Manasseh Meyer ===
Sir Manasseh Meyer (1843–1930) was a British businessman and philanthropist who was a benefactor to the Jewish community in Singapore. He was the Jewish community's most generous benefactor, being responsible for the setting up of its two synagogues — Maghain Aboth Synagogue and Chesed-El Synagogue. Chesed-El was built for the use of his family and others.

Together with three other wealthy Jews, Meyer bought a large piece of land in Moulmein Road for $5,407.12 for the Jewish Cemetery. Meyer also bought the adjoining piece of land for $8,681.40 and, after reserving a plot for himself and his second wife, Rebecca, presented it to the community. His wife, Rebecca, died in 1915.

In 1928, he donated $150,000 to the University of Malaya in Singapore (now the National University of Singapore), to build its science building, which has become a Singaporean national monument. Britain's King George V knighted him in 1929 after he donated $20,000 to the British military effort in World War I. Meyer Road in Singapore is named after him.

=== Frank Benjamin ===
Frank Benjamin is a merchant who founded the retailing company F J Benjamin in 1959. In 1975, he opened Singapore's first single-brand store, Lanvin, in the Grand Hyatt hotel.

=== Jacob Ballas ===
Jacob Ballas (1921–2000) was a Jewish stockbroker and philanthropist born in Iraq. He was the inaugural chairman of the Malayan Stock Exchange, from 1962 to 1964, and later the Malaysia and Singapore Stock Exchange from 1964 to 1967, growing the paid-up capital of the bourses from about $870 million to $2 billion. Unmarried, his estate was said to be worth more than S$100 million and was divided between charities in Singapore and Israel. His philanthropy in Singapore is marked by the Jacob Ballas Centre.

=== Joseph Grimberg ===
Joseph Grimberg (8 April 1933 – 17 August 2017) was a prominent lawyer and former Supreme Court judge.

=== Harry Elias ===
Harry Elias (4 May 1937 – 26 August 2020) was the founder of the law firm Harry Elias Partnership LLP and one of Singapore's top lawyers. In 1985, he set up the Criminal Legal Aid Scheme, in which lawyers defend for free those poor and accused of non-capital crimes. As of 2015, the scheme has grown to serve up to 6,000 people annually.

== Jewish community institutions ==
=== Maghain Aboth Synagogue ===
Maghain Aboth Synagogue is a synagogue located at Waterloo Street in the Rochor Planning Area, within the Central Area in Singapore's central business district. The synagogue was constructed by 1878 and is the oldest Jewish synagogue in Southeast Asia.

The synagogue is open throughout the year and is the primary synagogue of the Jewish community in Singapore, and is where many Jewish events and celebrations like Yom Kippur take place.

On 27 February 1998, the synagogue was gazetted as a national monument of Singapore.

=== Chesed-el Synagogue ===
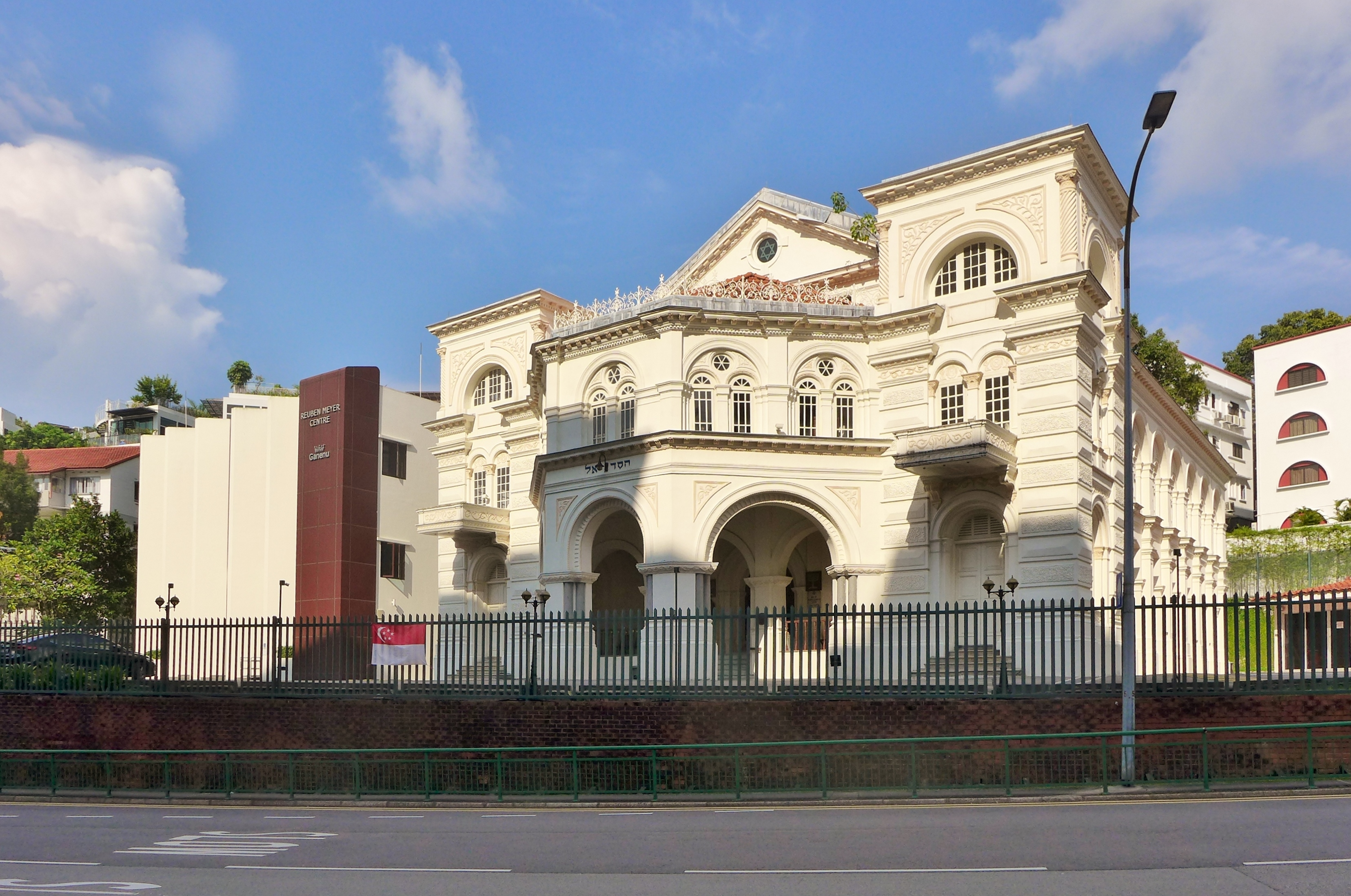
Chesed-el Synagogue

Chesed-El Synagogue is a synagogue at Oxley Rise in the River Valley Planning Area, within the Central Area of Singapore. Named Chesed-El, which means "Grace of God", the synagogue was completed in 1905 and is the second synagogue in Singapore.

The Chesed-El Synagogue was gazetted as a national monument on 18 December 1998.

=== United Hebrew Congregation ===
The United Hebrew Congregation (UHC Singapore) was formed in 1993. It is Singapore's only Reform Jewish community and the latest addition to Jewish life in Singapore's modern history. In 2016, it boasted a membership of over 400 Jews and their families, served by its resident Rabbi Nathan Alfred. Despite its membership size, the UHC operates as a synagogue without walls – services and events are held at various sites around the city. As of 2014, the UHC supports a weekly Jewish Religious School. The UHC and its members are dedicated to the Reform Jewish notion of Tikkun Olam, and have been engaged in various local and global fundraising and community service efforts.

=== Sir Manasseh Meyer International School ===
The Sir Manasseh Meyer International School (SMMIS) is Singapore's only Jewish international school, for students aged 18 months to 16 years. Admitting students of all nationalities and faiths, students choose to follow Jewish Education in Hebrew or World Religions in English.

The school was founded in 1996 by Mrs Simcha Abergel as a nursery for young children, named "Ganenu Learning Centre". The school was later renamed to its current name in 2008, while on its 170 student capacity campus in Belvedere Close, off Tanglin Road.

In 2016, the school's new SGD$40 million campus in Jalan Ulu Sembawang opened, with a student capacity of 500 and facilities like a rooftop swimming pool, football field and 450 seater auditorium.

== See also ==
- List of Asian Jews
- David Marshall
- David Elias Building
- Jews in Hong Kong
