= Kwan Im Thong Hood Cho Temple =

Chinese Buddhist temple in Singapore

Coordinates: 01°18′3.12″N 103°51′10.83″E

- 觀音堂佛祖廟
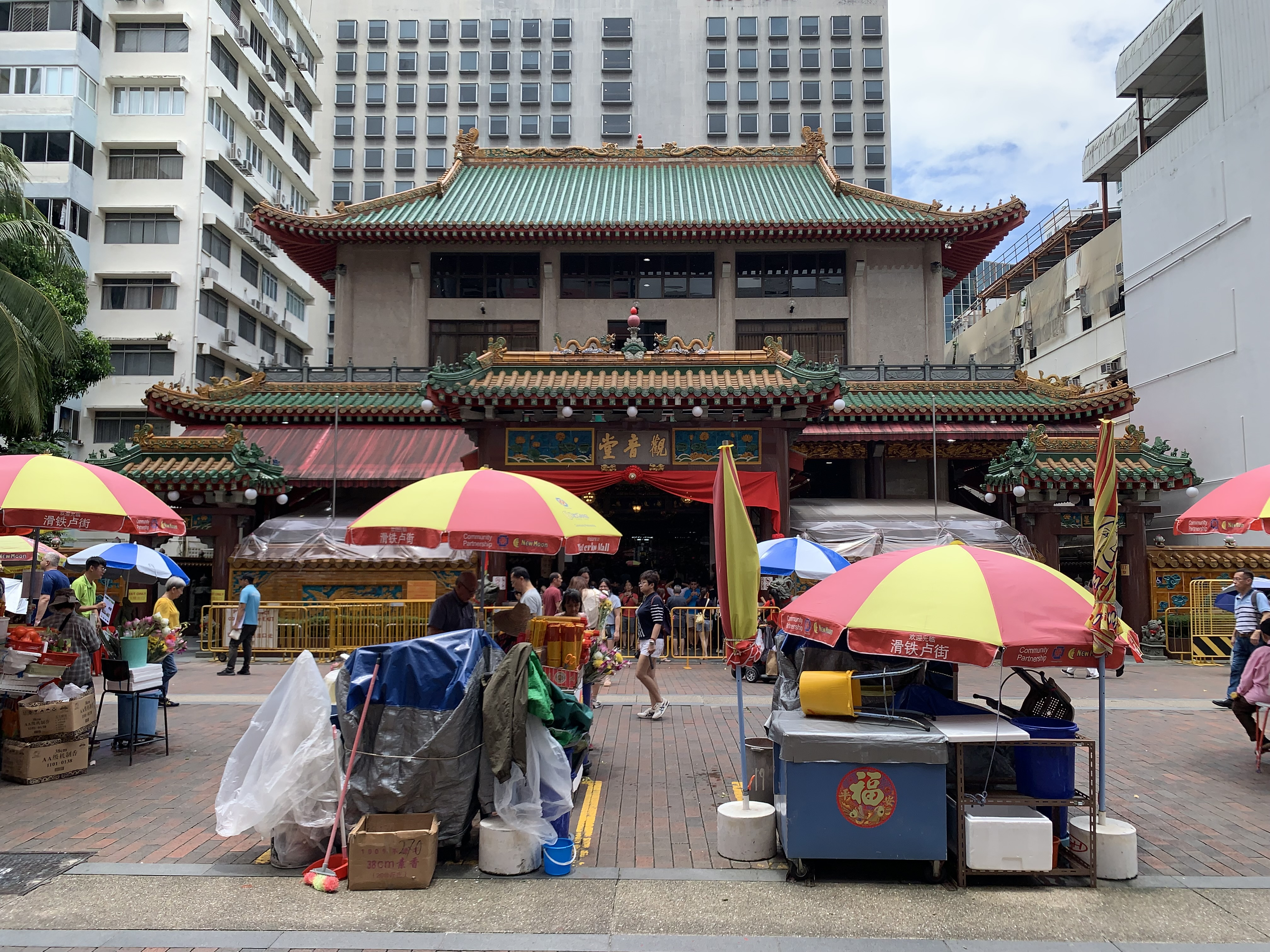
- The exterior of Kwan Im Thong Hood Cho Temple

- Location within Singapore

Monastery information
- Full name: Kwan Im Thong Hood Cho Temple
- Order: Mahayana, Vajrayana
- Established: 1884; 142 years ago

Site
- Location: Rochor, Singapore
- Public access: yes

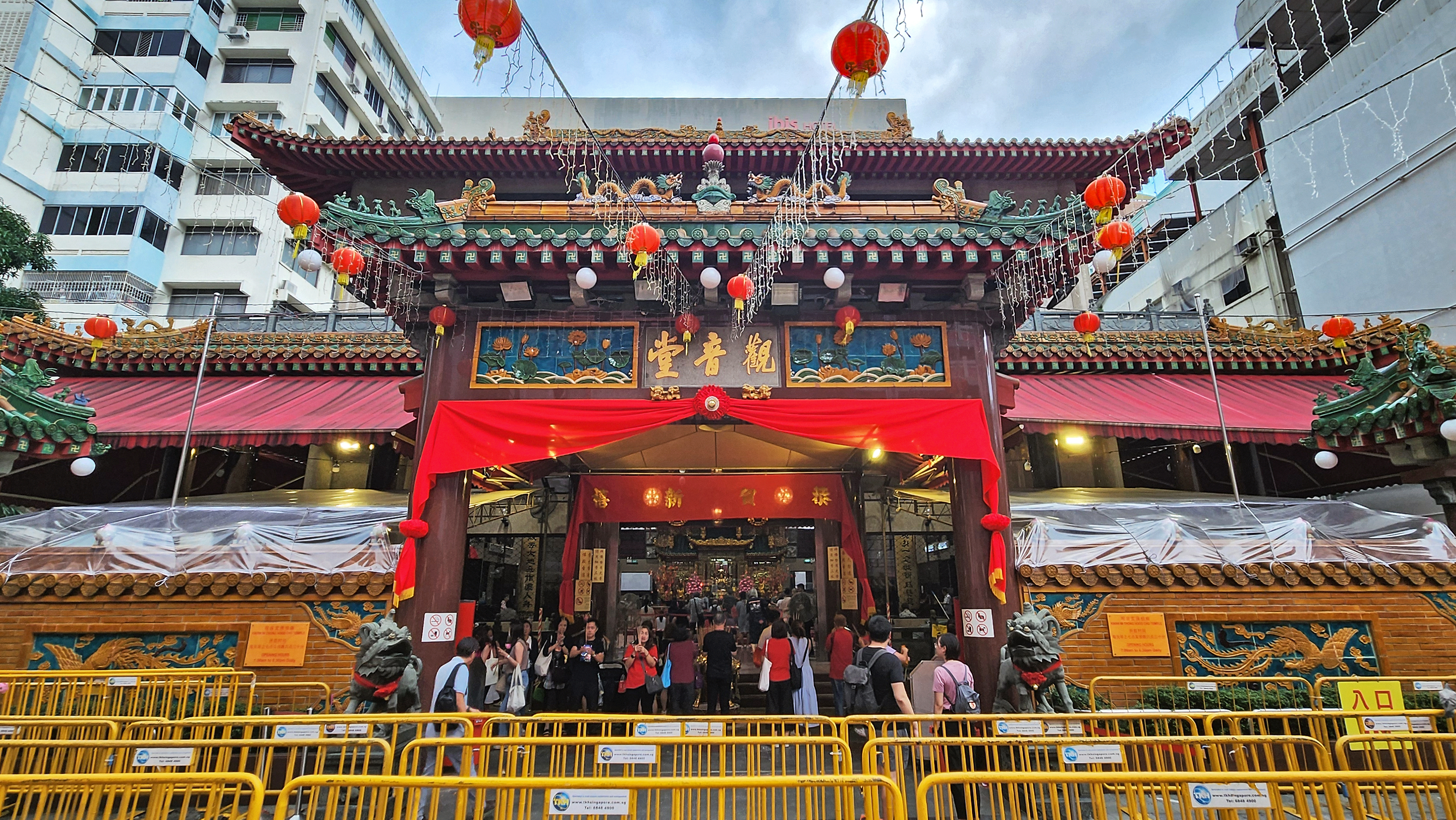
Kwan Im Thong Hood Cho Temple in February 2024.

Kwan Im Thong Hood Cho Temple (Chinese: 觀音堂佛祖廟; pinyin: Guānyīn Táng Fózǔ Miào; Pe̍h-ōe-jī: Koan-im Tông Hu̍t-chó͘ Biō) is a traditional Chinese temple situated at 178 Waterloo Street in Singapore. The temple is of significance to the Buddhist community among Chinese Singaporeans, and is believed to bring worshippers good luck after praying to the Kuan Yin or Avalokiteśvara, the Goddess of Mercy. The temple is also involved in charity work, contributing to several health and educational organisations.

The Kwan Im Temple and the nearby Sri Krishnan Temple are known for having evolved a social practice termed "cross-worshipping", where many devotees of either temple also worship at the other. This practice is commonly seen as a microcosm of Singapore's multi-religious society.

== History and architecture ==
According to inscriptions at the temple, the temple started in 1884 when a company, Chen Liang Cheng (陈两成), donated a parcel of land to build a temple.

In 1895, the temple was renovated and in 1980, it went through a major expansion and renovation. The 1980 expansion costs $5 million and when completed, the temple stands on an area of 1500 square meters, almost double the size of the original temple.

== Worship ==
The temple's main worship is Cundi, a manifestation of Guanyin. It also worship Damo and Hua Tuo. A statue of Tathagata Buddha is also placed behind Kuan Yin. On top of the altar there is also the Four Heavenly Kings.

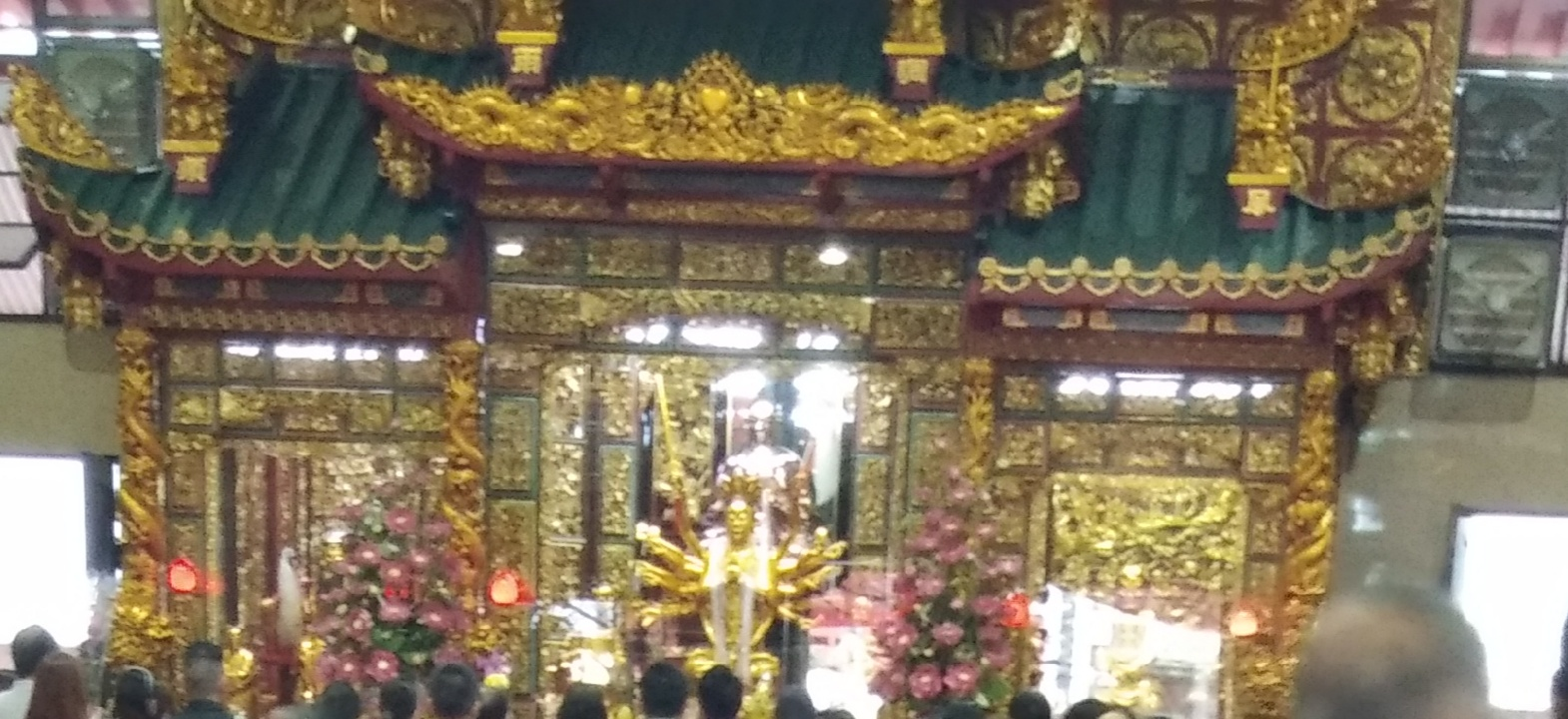

In the traditional folk religious landscape, a practice of "cross-worshipping" has developed between devotees of the Sri Krishnan Temple and the Kwan Im Thong Hood Cho Temple, where many devotees of either temple also worship or pay their respects at the other temple. Both temples are of polytheistic religious nature: Hinduism and the Chinese traditional religion, and this practice is commonly seen as a microcosm of Singapore's multi-religious society. In the late 1980s, a seller of Hainanese chicken rice donated a large urn, worth approximately S$1,000, to the Sri Krishnan Temple, to hold the joss sticks of Chinese worshippers. The Sri Krishnan Temple administration has added a statue of Guanyin inside their temple and designated a zone within the temple compound for Chinese worshippers to burn joss sticks.
