= Michelle Tan =

Singaporean playwright

- Born: Singapore
- Education: Brown University (BA)
- Occupations: Playwright; Drama Educator

Michelle Tan is a Singaporean playwright and drama educator. As a playwright, her work has been produced by several Singapore theatre companies including Cake Theatrical Productions, Singapore Repertory Theatre, Gateway Arts and Esplanade Theatres.

== Early life and education ==
Tan was born in Singapore. She undertook her undergraduate studies in the United States at Brown University in Providence, Rhode Island, and graduated in 2010 with a BA in Theatre Arts & Performance Studies (Playwriting) and French Studies.

== Career ==
In 2012, Garisan Kuning, an original short story by Tan, was published as part of an anthology of Singaporean work titled The Ayam Curtain.

Thereafter, in 2014, Garisan Kuning (Stand Behind the Yellow Line), an original play by Tan, was performed under the direction of Samantha Scott-Blackhall, as part of Singapore Repertory Theatre's Made In Singapore series. In the same year, Tan adapted Henrik Ibsen's classic play A Doll's House for Our Company, a Singapore non-profit theatre company, and Tan's adaption was described by Today as an admirable localisation of Ibsen's play with "some pretty sharp writing". The Straits Times also described the strength of the adaptation in finding the parallels between Ibsen's work and society.

During her stint as resident writer and drama instructor with Cake Theatrical Productions, Tan wrote Versus, a commissioned work for the 2015 Singapore International Festival of Arts. Tan also co-wrote Electra, which was nominated for Best Original Script in the 2016 The Straits Times Life! Theatre Award, Instructions for Swimming; Notes on Drowning, which was described by Today Online as a "humour-tinged drama", and Ophelia, which was described by Today Online as "a piece that resonated with issues of self-actualisation, especially for women".

In 2018, I am trying to say something true, an original play by Tan, was performed under the direction of T. Sasitharan for Esplanade Theatres' 2018 Studios season. The play, which delved into deep psychological tensions, was described by The Straits Times as a "sharp, tight script", which carried "lightness and optimism, with a dash of self-deprecating humour and razor-sharp sarcasm". Local media reviewer, Bakchormeeboy, noted that Tan "knows how to wield emotion like a sword, cutting deep with her words". The Arts Equator also noted that Tan used language "exquisitely" to "articulate inarticulacy". The play was nominated for Best Original Script in the 2019 The Straits Times Life! Theatre Awards. I am trying to say something true was restaged under the direction of Renee Yeong with Esplanade Theatres in 2023.

In 2020, Miss Aruna Nair teaches Plato’s Cave via Home-Based Learning in the Pandemic of 2020, an original monologue by Tan, was directed by Cherilyn Woo as part of Singapore Repertory Theatre's production titled The Coronalogues.

In 2022, Tan wrote the play 12 going on 13, which was intended to help adolescents navigate uncertainties and changes. The play was directed by Ian Loy and produced by Gateway Arts for schools in Singapore in 2022 and 2023. The play also had a public run in 2024.

Tan was also commissioned to write for the 2023 rendition of March On, Esplanade Theatres' annual children's festival. The play, The Beginning of Anything, was performed at the Esplanade Theatres under the direction of Edith Podesta.

In 2022, Tan was appointed as the first writer-in-residence for Centre 42's New Scripts Residency Programme.

In 2024, The Radicalisation of Mrs Mary Lim-Rodrigues, an original play by Tan, received a work-in-progress reading under the 2024 Singapore International Festival of Arts' New Works Platform after being developed with Centre 42.

Tan is currently teaching full-time in the Faculty of Theatre at the School of the Arts, Singapore.

== Works ==
=== Plays ===
- (When I'm) Sixty Four (2012)
- Fairytale Ending (2012)
- The Tempest (Storm in a Teacup (2013)
- Garisan Kuning (Stand Behind the Yellow Line) (2014)
- Dear Nora (an adaptation of Ibsen’s classic play A Doll’s House) (2014)
- Versus (2015)
- Instructions for Swimming; Notes on Drowning (co-written with Natalie Hennedige) (2015)
- Woman of the Book (co-written with Natalie Hennedige) (2016)
- Ophelia (co-written with Natalie Hennedige) (2016)
- Electra (co-written with Natalie Hennedige) (2016)
- I am trying to say something true (2018)
- Miss Aruna Nair teaches Plato’s Cave via Home-Based Learning in the Pandemic of 2020 (2020)
- Frayed Ends (2021)
- 12 going on 13 (2022)
- The Beginning of Anything (2023)
- The Radicalisation of Mrs Mary Lim-Rodrigues (2024)

=== Plays for schools (Singapore Youth Festival - Drama) ===
- Rise and Fall (based on Shakespeare's Julius Caesar) (2015)
- Cloud Play (2018)
- Storybook People (2019)
- The Pursuit (2024)
- The Same Boat (2024)
- What are you afraid of? (2024)

=== Published writing ===
- Garisan Kuning (as part of an anthology of Singaporean work titled The Ayam Curtain (Math Paper Press, 2012) ISBN 9789810740085)
- Monolith (2015)
