= Centre 42 =

Writing and theatre development centre in Singapore

- Established: 7 July 2014; 12 years ago
- Location: 42 Waterloo St, 42, Singapore 187951
- Type: Arts Centre
- Founders: Casey Lim; Robin Loon; Michele Lim; Chiu Chien Seen
- Executive director: Casey Lim
- Public transit access: CC2 Bras Basah; DT21 Bencoolen; EW12 DT14 Bugis
- Website: centre42.sg

Centre 42, located at 42 Waterloo Street is Singapore’s first institution dedicated to playwriting and theatre development.

Established in 2014, the non-profit writing centre focuses on English language theatre and aims to “document, create and promote writing for the Singapore stage” through programmes, residencies and collaboration with other industry players. Centre 42 also runs The C42 Archive of Singapore Theatre.

The centre has been located at the historic bungalow of 42 Waterloo Street since 2014 under the National Arts Council’s (NAC) Arts Housing Scheme. They have been a major company grant recipient from 2023 until present.

Its name pays homage to Centre 65, Singapore’s first arts centre started by theatre pioneer Goh Poh Seng.

== History ==
Origins

From 1992 to 1995, under Phase Two of the NAC's Arts Housing Scheme, conserved buildings on Waterloo Street were slated for transformation into an arts belt. The bungalow at 42 Waterloo Street was one such site gazetted to become a creative space. It was first occupied by Action Theatre from 1999 to 2012 which then moved to Aliwal Arts Centre.

In 2013, the NAC held consultations with arts and theatre industry professionals for the Plan for the Performing Arts, a five-year plan to chart the course for art forms ranging from contemporary to traditional performing arts. The arts community surfaced the need for critical research and “supporting infrastructure” for playwriting development. An open call under the Framework for Arts Spaces Arts Centre Scheme was conducted by the NAC to solicit partners and proposals to set up an organization at 42 Waterloo Street that could satisfy this aim of developing playwriting in Singapore.

A collective of theatre practitioners consisting of Casey Lim, Robin Loon, Chiu Chien Seen and Michele Lim, collectively known as—Two-And-Fifty-Years or TAFY—won the three-year contract, which included funding of up to $3.4 million from 2014 until 2018.

Together with the NAC, TAFY set up Centre 42 within the year. Of the new initiative, the NAC said:

“Centre 42 will be a focal point for content creation, documentation and promotion of Singapore theatre. Through industry partnerships, the centre will offer programmes such as residencies, mentorships, workshops, readings and stagings, serving as an intermediary between creators, producers and presenters to facilitate the development of content.”

=== Opening ===
On 7 July 2014, the Centre was officially opened by then Minister of Community, Culture and Youth Lawrence Wong.

Minister Wong deemed Centre 42’s opening in the middle of the Waterloo arts belt as “apt” due to it coinciding with other arts festivities during that period; Victoria Theatre and Concert Hall reopened that same week after a four-year refurbishment, and the Singapore International Festival of Arts relaunched after a one-year hiatus, later in August.

==== Facilities ====
While Action Theatre was in tenancy from 1999 to 2012, the Waterloo Street site comprised two outdoor performance spaces, indoor studios, two rehearsal rooms and a café.

Then, prior to the opening of Centre 42 in 2014, the space was refurbished to enhance its usability as a theatre development centre. In addition to the Centre 42 office, the bungalow featured the following new amenities:

- Black box
- Rehearsal studio
- Meeting room

The spaces were designed to be modular to cater to diverse needs of the arts and theatre community in hosting lectures, workshops and performances.

Centre 42 had custodianship of the 42 Waterloo Street compound from 2014 until 2021. Thereafter, the Arts Resource Hub took over the management of the space, and Centre 42 occupied an office space in the annex building from 2022 until present. See Establishment of Arts Resource Hub at 42 Waterloo Street.

== Programme Platforms ==
Centre 42 runs programmes such as incubations, residencies and discussion platforms to encourage original creations and engagement with Singapore theatre history.

In 2020, the Centre restructured its residencies following changes to its resourcing and industry needs.

=== 2014 – 2020 ===
==== Residencies ====
Boiler Room

Boiler Room was an incubation platform to develop work for the stage. Scripts would undergo a process lasting 10 to 12 months which included writing, research, dramaturgical and directorial support that culminated in dramatised presentations.

In the first iteration, 28 applications were received via an open call and three playwrights were selected. Boiler Room ran for three cycles from 2014 to 2016 .

The Garage

The Garage was Centre 42’s practice development platform, targeting practitioners in different areas of theatre.

The platform only ran one cycle in 2015 for dramaturgs. The Garage saw three practitioners trained and was eventually discontinued in 2020.

Fellowship

Fellowship was a by-invite-only grant scheme that supported the development of the selected Fellow’s project. The project proposed would have to align with Centre 42’s objectives. In return, the Fellow would actively participate in Centre 42’s other programmes.

The residency saw two Fellows and was eventually discontinued in 2020.

Basement Workshop

Basement Workshop was a residency that invited Singaporean-based theatre artists to further develop their text-based work.

It was later restructured as the Creation Residency in 2020.

The Vault

The Vault residency invites artists to activate and reinvent the Singapore Theatre canon through contemporary performance responses.

Writer Corrie Tan notes that this platform “archives performance through performance itself, giving physical shape to oral histories”.

Since 2019, Centre 42 has also collaborated with the National University of Singapore’s (NUS) Theatre and Performance Studies programme to present responses for The Vault platform. The Vault has been a residency offer at Centre 42 from 2014 to present.

==== Platforms ====
The Living Room

The Living Room was set up as a platform for talks, lectures, and seminars related to playwriting and art-making.

As part of The Living Room, the annual Year in Review series discussed Singapore theatre happenings from 2017 to 2021. Year in Review invited makers, critics and audiences to revisit theatrical events, discuss trends and celebrate local theatre.

The Repository

Launched in 2015, The Repository was Centre 42’s publicly-accessible library of archived materials from Singapore’s theatre history. In collaboration with arts companies and organisations, The Repository documented and digitised visual and audio artefacts, as well as physical theatre ephemera like programme booklets, ticket stubs and manuscripts. The Repository was accompanied by a resource list of Singapore Theatre publications available for browsing at Centre 42’s Book Den.

The Repository formed the basis of The C42 Archive of Singapore Theatre, an expanded archive launched in 2021. See The C42 Archive of Singapore Theatre.

Citizens' Reviews

The Citizens' Reviews programme recruited aspiring theatre reviewers to contribute critical arts writing which would receive editorial critique before getting published publicly on the centre’s site. The programme ran from 2014 to 2019 with 513 reviews written by 36 Citizen Reviewers for 376 unique theatre productions.

=== 2020 – Present ===
In 2020, Centre 42 reviewed their residency and programmes. While some platforms have evolved from their previous incarnations, new platforms are observed to have been introduced as the needs of the landscape changes. As of 2026, its residency platforms are divided into three themes: new writing development, developing practice and engaging history.

==== Residencies ====
New Scripts Garage

Formerly known as Guest Room, the platform was rebranded as the New Scripts Garage to incubate new original works, providing dramaturgical support through table reads or individual consultation sessions.

Writer-in-Residence

The Writer-In-Residence programme supports experienced mid-career playwrights in developing their writing.

Playwrights Professional Development Residency (PPDR)

The PPDR is a two-year residency for early career playwrights to develop their writing.

Co-Lab Residency

The Co-Lab Residency encourages collaborative exploration of text-based practice.

Creation Residency

Formerly known as Basement Workshop, the platform was rebranded as the Creation Residency to incubate new original works, providing dramaturgical support through table reads or individual consultation sessions.

The Vault and Vault: Lite Residency

A mainstay since the Centre’s inception, The Vault has since hatched The Vault: Lite initiative, an experimental offshoot exploring genre, form and content.

Archival Residency

The Archival Residency is a space for practitioners to form an artefact-centred archival project that invites wider engagement from the theatre community.

== The C42 Archive of Singapore Theatre ==
Since 2015, The Repository had been the centre’s digital archive of theatre artefacts, collecting programme booklets, photographs and theatre ephemera. At its launch, the archive had more than 800 documents available for browsing. Within a year, the collection had doubled to 1,600 items, featuring materials from major theatre companies like The Necessary Stage, The Theatre Practice, Singapore Repertory Theatre and even dormant theatre collectives By 2021, The Repository’s collection grew to over 2,400 artefacts, spanning 1966 to 2019.

In 2020, a review of The Repository was undertaken by Centre 42 to expand the archival efforts.

In May 2021, Centre 42 launched The C42 Archive of Singapore Theatre, encompassing The Repository’s collection.

As of 2026, the archive holds the following documentation for the Singapore Theatre scene:

- Collaterals such as programme booklets and brochures
- Information about theatre productions and stagings
- Reviews from the Citizen’s Reviewers programme and an inherited collection of The Flying Inkpot reviews
- Publications of scripts and theatre writing
- Unpublished scripts
- Critical essays and writings
- Audiovisual recordings such as performance archives and artist interviews
- Photographs
- Information about theatre organisations and their developmental platforms
- A network of theatre practitioners and contributors

As part of documentation efforts, Centre 42 has released the annual "Singapore Theatre Timeline" since 2017, tracking the annual number of shows staged by Singaporean theatre companies and collectives, alongside other prominent statistics.

== Dramaturgy ==
=== Asian Dramaturg’s Network ===
The Asian Dramaturg’s Network (ADN) was founded by performance-maker, dramaturg and dance researcher Lim How Ngean in 2016. Lim conceptualized the ADN in collaboration with Centre 42.

Since 2016, ADN has gathered dramaturgs and practitioners at conferences to discuss the practice, including:

- ADN Symposium in April 2016 held at Centre 42 and Esplanade Theatre Studio
- ADN’s Satellite Symposium in Adelaide in 2017, supported by OzAsia and NAC and
- ACT 2024: ACTive Encounter – ACT x Asian Dramaturgs’ Network, in collaboration with Shanghai Dramatic Arts Centre and the NAC.

The ADN has also released a series of three zines, ADN Re/View (Volume 1 to 3), and the publication (Asian) Dramaturgs’ Network: Sensing, Complexity, Tracing and Doing.

=== Dramaturgs-in-Residence Programme ===
This programme was launched in 2025 to invite practitioners to develop their dramaturgical capabilities, deepen the practice in the landscape and build the network of dramaturgs in Singapore.

== Collaborations ==
Besides residencies, Centre 42 has also collaborated with other arts organisations and initiatives:

- Sound Plot (2023 – Present): In collaboration with the Nanyang Technological University (NTU) Museum and Artwave Studio to create audio plays inspired by regions in Singapore.
- Late Night Texting (2016 – 2019): In collaboration with BrasBasah.Bugis Precinct’s Singapore Night Festival, to present a public showcase of bite-sized theatre by emerging and independent theatremakers.
- Watch This Space: In collaboration with The Finger Players’ to groom playwrights and directors.

== Establishment of Arts Resource Hub at 42 Waterloo Street ==
In 2018, the NAC released a five-year policy blueprint, Our SG Arts Plan, with a key prerogative to support arts freelancers, also known as self-employed persons (SEPs). To respond to this need to support sustainable careers for the SEPs, the NAC launched the Arts Resource Hub (ARH) initiative in phases from September 2019, starting with a web portal with online resources on job opportunities, legal and financial support. The move was well-received by the community members who sought career support.

Two co-working spaces at the Goodman Arts Centre (GAC) and Stamford Arts Centres (SAC) were subsequently established in January 2020 to provide amenities such as Wi-Fi, meeting rooms and printers to freelancers, “addressing the community’s desire for a space to connect and network with like-minded peers”.

Then, in January 2020, it was announced at a closed-door dialogue with selected arts freelancers—and subsequently publicly reported by The Straits Times—that the 42 Waterloo Street site would undergo renovations from May 2020. It would then reopen as a third site under the ARH. Unlike the first two spaces at GAC and SAC, the 42 Waterloo Street site was slated to become a multidisciplinary space available for “rehearsals, discussions and presentations” for use by the whole arts community, including artists from the visual and literary scene.

Where Centre 42 previously had custodianship over the entire 512 square-meter site both for their own programmes and as a venue manager, they would return to the space as a co-tenant, occupying only the office unit and sharing 10% of the site with the ARH office. ARH would henceforth oversee the management of the spaces and amenities while Centre 42 would be eligible for priority booking of the spaces at subsidised rates.

The NAC also announced structural changes to the site, including a facelift of the exterior, a refurbished Black Box theatre and rehearsal studio, and improvements for accessibility.

=== Response from community ===
Following the announcement, many in the arts community reacted with dismay. Many bemoaned the move as “cannibalizing already-scarce spaces for creating and presenting creative works”. Regional arts writing platform Arts Equator reported that while many from the community paid tribute to how Centre 42 had helped numerous artists and grown over 200 new local works, others expressed worry regarding the change in management from an agile intermediary run by artists to a “bureaucratic organization” and how it would affect the dynamics of art-making. It was also unclear how Centre 42 themselves would be affected with a “loss of remit over the running of the actual space”.

Additionally, Arts Equator pointed out several communication missteps by the NAC, such as a “confusing drip-feed of information” and the creation of a “false binary”, appearing to pit the needs of SEPs and other, non-theatre practitioners against Centre 42’s, despite the latter’s extensive work with independent SEPs and across arts genres.

Another observer, Assistant Professor Dr. Hoe Sufern from the Singapore Management University, noted that the Centre has reached over 40,000 members of the public through its efforts and built an organic community within a few short years.

Despite an interest in fostering community engagement and place-making, Dr. Hoe noted that policymakers ironically “re-concentrated the resources and power from a people-initiated organisation back to the state through the ARH”, with a new policy coming “at the expense of an arts organisation which represent(ed) key objectives of a previous policy”. Dr. Hoe wrote that this move echoed a history of rapidly shifting cultural policy and resource allocation by the state.

On 3 March 2020, the NAC responded to Dr. Hoe to reaffirm their continued funding support for Centre 42 for the next three years.

“We believe Centre 42’s mandate as an intermediary to grow artmaking is not diminished or at odds with the introduction of the Arts Resource Hub at 42 Waterloo Street.” —Yeoh Phee Suan, Director, Marketing, Communications and Digital Strategy, National Arts Council

In July 2020, plans were announced for three more arts institutions—The Intercultural Theatre Institute, The Necessary Stage and The Substation—to move out of their long-time homes, prompting comparison to the Centre 42 case and more public concerns regarding arts housing and policy.

=== Reopening ===
In September 2020 and April 2021, the NAC conducted consultations with the arts community and provided updates on the refurbishment plans. During these sessions, Centre 42 and ARH shared their programming plans. Arts practitioners could also give feedback and seek clarifications about the operational changes for the space.

Renovations at 42 Waterloo Street were completed in May 2021. In November 2021, 42 Waterloo Street reopened with Centre 42 as a co-tenant, with ARH managing and maintaining the site.

== See Also ==
- National Arts Council
- 42 Waterloo Street
- Waterloo Street
