= Singapore Calligraphy Centre =

Historic bungalow in Singapore

Coordinates: 1°17′55″N 103°51′03″E

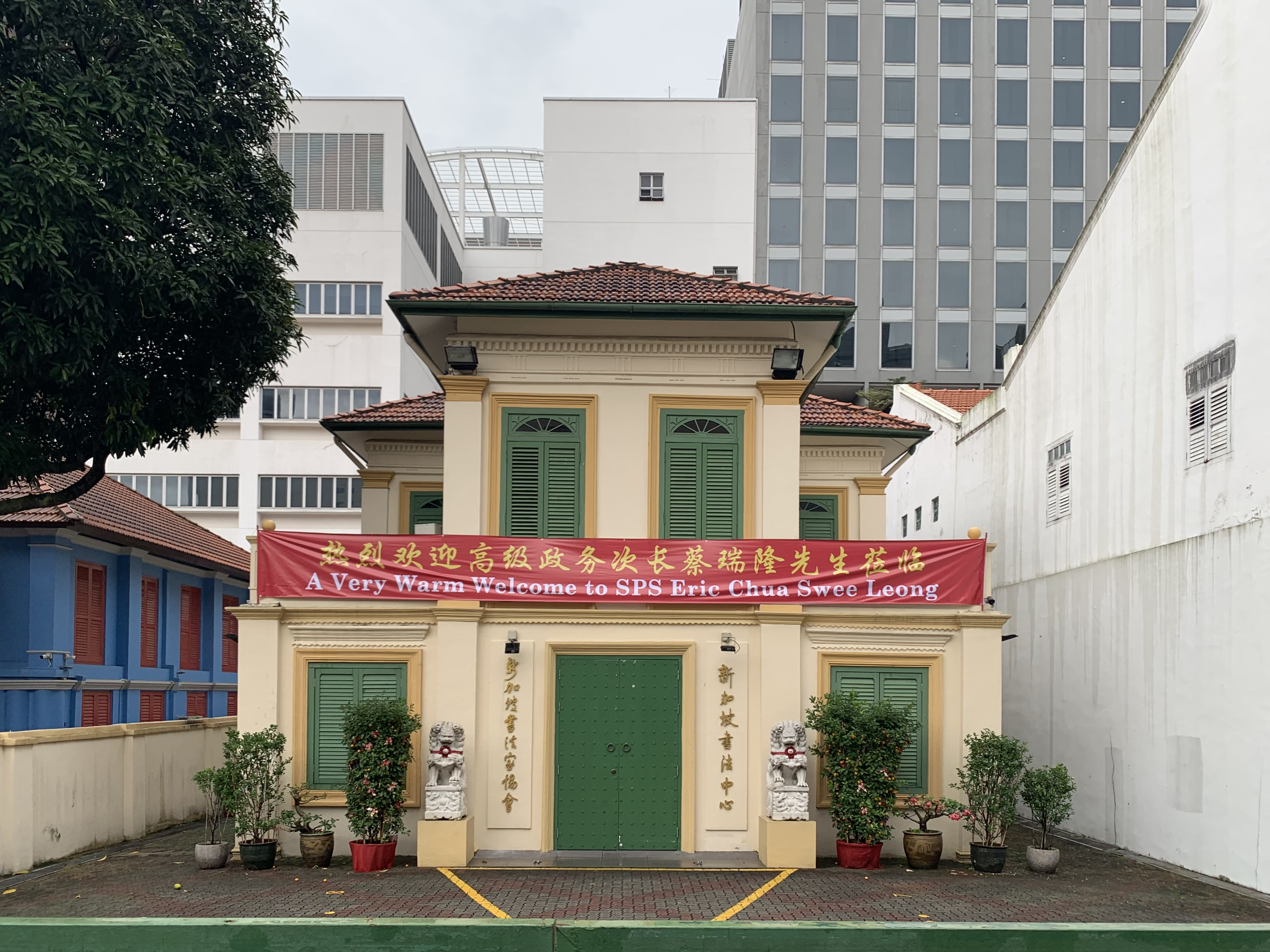
The building in 2023

Singapore Calligraphy Centre, also known as 48 Waterloo Street, is a bungalow on Waterloo Street in downtown Singapore which currently houses the Chinese Calligraphy Society Of Singapore.

== Description ==
The building is architecturally symmetrical. It features high ceilings and tall windows. It is surrounded by an ornate brick and plaster wall with a wrought iron gate.

== History ==
In 1899, 20 Russian Jews were reported to have been arrested at the bungalow on gambling-related charges. However, the charges was dismissed, with the defence's lawyer arguing that the arrested had only been playing cards without gambling. In 1908, 19 Chinese men were fined $3 each for gambling at the building, while its owner was fined $75.

Beginning in 1994, the building underwent a $1.31 million renovation under the National Arts Council Arts Housing Scheme. The renovation took 15 months. In November 1995, the building reopened as the first home of the Chinese Calligraphy Society Of Singapore, with a conference room, and audio-visual room, an exhibition hall which was available for rental and five classrooms. It was officially opened by then-Minister for Home Affairs Wong Kan Seng on 27 May 1996. The building is one of several on Waterloo Street to have been renovated under the scheme, along with the Stamford Arts Centre, 42 Waterloo Street, 54-58 Waterloo Street, which currently houses The Theatre Practice, and 60 Waterloo Street, which currently houses Dance Ensemble Singapore.
