= 60 Waterloo Street =

Historic bungalow in Singapore

Coordinates: 1°17′56″N 103°51′04″E

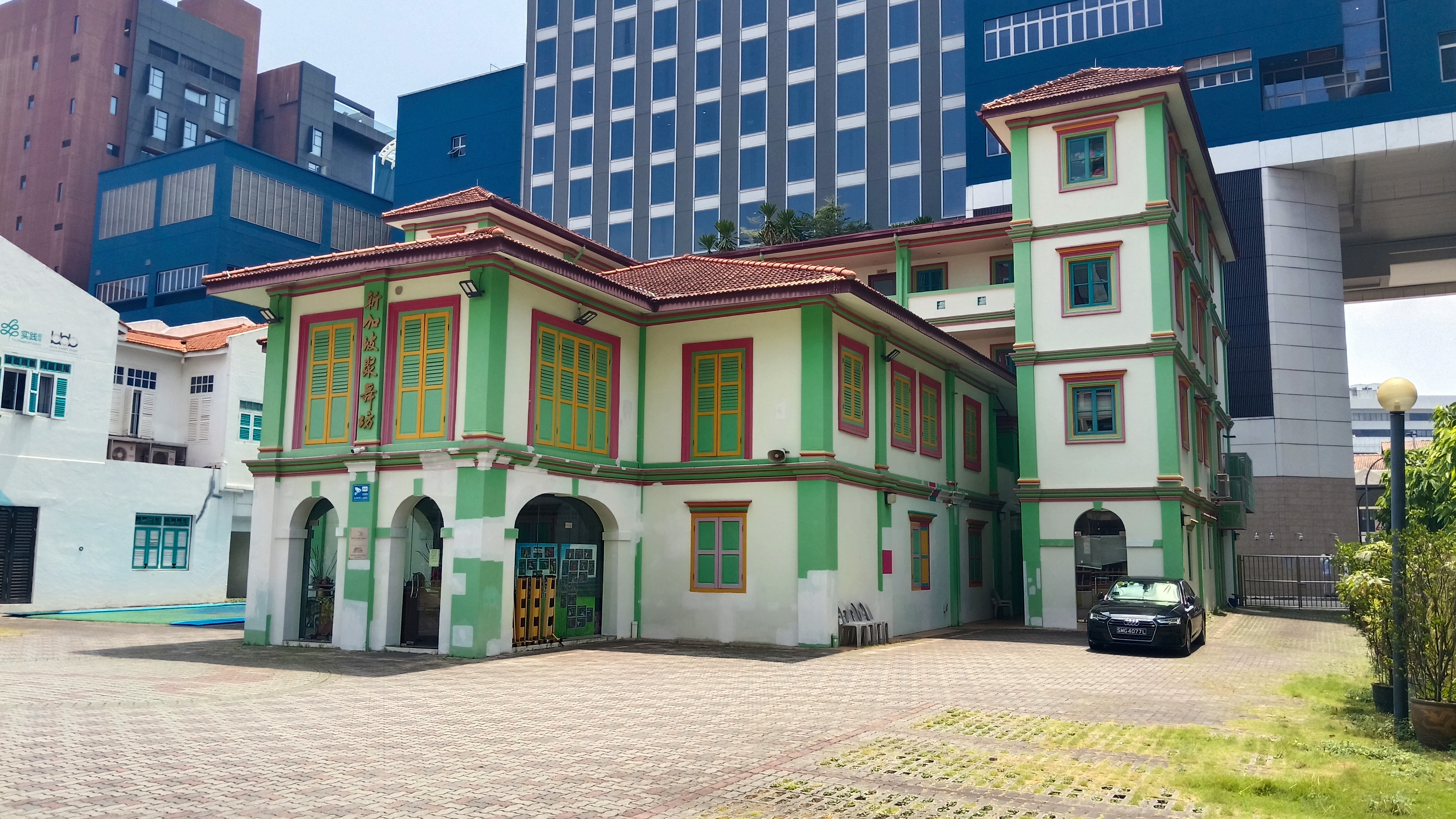
The building in 2026

60 Waterloo Street is a historic bungalow on Waterloo Street in downtown Singapore. A second four-storey building was constructed behind the bungalow when the Dance Ensemble Singapore moved into the bungalow in 1995.

== Description ==
The two-storey building is symmetrical and features high ceilings, tall windows and a red pitched tile roof, and it is surrounded by a garden compound with a wrought iron gate. Arched doorways can be found on the ground floor while the French windows on the upper floor are covered with timbre louvred shutters.

== History ==
The home served as the residence of A. S. Desker, a prominent member of the Eurasian community of Singapore, and his wife, Mary Caroline Elisabeth. In 1919, the company owned by prominent businessman Tan Kah Kee listed the building for rent. In 1923, the Massage Hall, which was owned by a Mrs Haru and a Miss Hana and was previously on Bencoolen Street, moved into the building. The business continued to operate until September 1941.

After World War II, the building was purchased by the Jewish Welfare Board, after which it was converted into the old folks' home. The Urban Redevelopment Authority took over ownership of the vacant building in 1983. In 1986, three businessmen rented the building from the authority and converted it into the Waterloo Food Paradise, an eating house 8 hawker stalls. The Tai Chuan Eating House occupied the building around 1990.

From 1995 to 1996, the building underwent a $1.28 million renovation and restoration under the National Arts Council Arts Housing Scheme, after which theatre organisation Dance Ensemble Singapore moved into the bungalow, which then included five dance studios. It was officially reopened by Loh Meng See, then a Member of Parliament representing the Kampong Glam Group Representation Constituency, on 25 May 1996. A four-storey annex building, featuring eight dance studios, a music room, a conference room, two instructors' rooms and a costume room, was constructed behind the bungalow.

The building is one of several on Waterloo Street to have been renovated under the scheme, along with the Stamford Arts Centre, 42 Waterloo Street, the Singapore Calligraphy Centre, which houses the Chinese Calligraphy Society of Singapore, and 54-58 Waterloo Street, which currently houses The Theatre Practice.
