= A Doll's House =

1879 three-act play by Henrik Ibsen

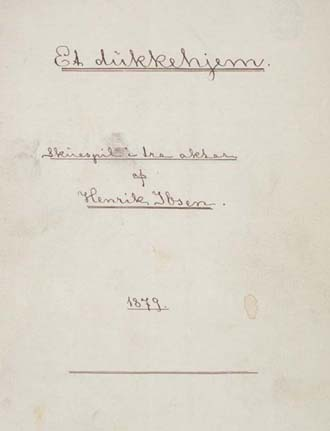
- Original manuscript cover page, 1879
- Original language: Norwegian, Danish
- Written by: Henrik Ibsen
- Characters: Nora; Torvald Helmer; Krogstad; Mrs. Linde; Dr. Rank; Children; Anne-Marie; Helene
- Subject: The awakening of a middle-class wife and mother
- Genre: Naturalistic/realistic problem play Modern tragedy
- Setting: The home of the Helmer family in an unspecified Norwegian town or city, c. 1879

Premiere
- Date: 21 December 1879
- Place: Royal Danish Theatre, Copenhagen, Denmark

A Doll's House (Danish and Bokmål: Et dukkehjem; also translated as A Doll House) is a three-act play written by Norwegian playwright Henrik Ibsen. It premiered at the Royal Danish Theatre in Copenhagen, Denmark, on 20 December 1879, having been published earlier that month. The play is set in a Norwegian town c. 1879.

The play concerns the fate of a married woman, who, at the time in Norway, lacked reasonable opportunities for self-fulfillment in a male-dominated world. Despite the fact that Ibsen denied it was his intent to write a feminist play, it was a great sensation at the time and caused a "storm of outraged controversy" that went beyond the theatre to the world of newspapers and society.

In 2006, the centennial of Ibsen's death, A Doll's House held the distinction of being the world's most-performed play that year. UNESCO has inscribed Ibsen's autographed manuscripts of A Doll's House on the Memory of the World Register in 2001, in recognition of their historical value.

The title of the play is most commonly translated as A Doll's House, though some scholars use A Doll House. John Simon says that A Doll's House is "the British term for what [Americans] call a 'dollhouse'". Egil Törnqvist says of the alternative title: "Rather than being superior to the traditional rendering, it simply sounds more idiomatic to Americans."

== List of characters ==
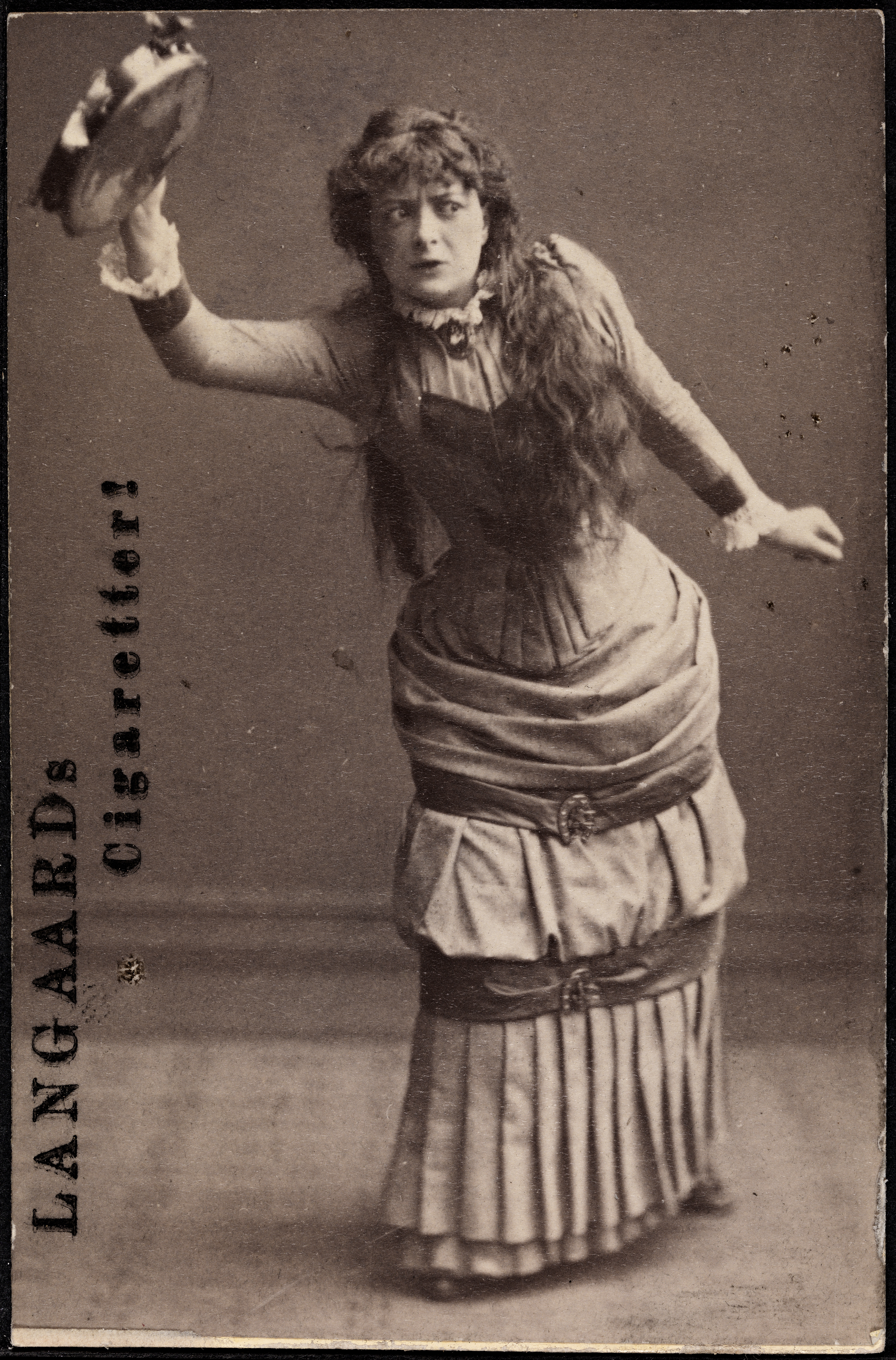
Cigarette card (c. 1880 – c. 1882) depicting Adeleide Johannessen as Nora Helmer.

Nora Helmer
Wife of Torvald; she is a mother of three. She is living out the ideal of the 19th-century wife. She feels stifled in her marriage.
Torvald Helmer
Nora's husband; a recently promoted bank manager. He professes to be enamored of his wife.
Dr. Rank / Peter Rank
A family friend. He is terminally ill. The dialogue implies that his "tuberculosis of the spine" originates from a venereal disease contracted by his father.

(The character's name in Michael Meyer's 1965 translation is Peter Rank.)

Kristine Linde / Christine Linde
Nora's old school friend, widowed, is seeking employment. She was in a relationship with Krogstad prior to the play's setting.

(Some English translations localize the spelling of the name Kristine to Christine.)

Nils Krogstad
An employee at Torvald's bank. He is a single father pushed to desperation. We are led to believe that he is a scoundrel, but events reveal him to be a long-lost lover of Kristine.
The Children
Nora and Torvald's three children: Ivar, Bobby, and Emmy.
Anne Marie
Nanny to the Helmer children, and former nanny to their mother Nora. She says that she gave up her own illegitimate daughter to "strangers" when she became the only mother that Nora knew.
Helene
The Helmers' maid.
The Porter
Delivers a Christmas tree to the Helmer household at the beginning of the play.

== Synopsis ==
=== Act One ===
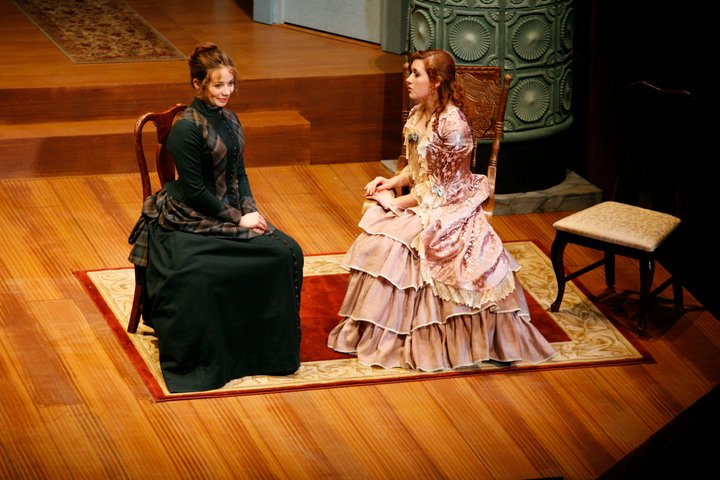
Mrs. Linde and Nora converse (from a 2012 production)

Just prior to Christmas, Nora Helmer returns from shopping carrying many packages and presents. Her husband, Torvald, is working in his study. He playfully rebukes Nora for spending so much money on Christmas gifts, calling her his "little squirrel". He teases her about how, the previous year, she had spent weeks making gifts and ornaments by hand because money was scarce. Torvald has been recently promoted at the bank where he works, so Nora feels that they can now let themselves go a little. The maid announces two visitors: Mrs. Kristine Linde, an old friend of Nora's, who has come seeking employment; and Dr. Rank, a close friend of the family, who is let into the study. Kristine explains that she has fallen into poverty following her husband's death. Nora is empathetic, recalling her own past troubles: Torvald became very sick, and they had to travel to Italy for a rest cure. Nora promises to talk to Torvald about finding her a job. Kristine gently tells Nora that she is like a child. Nora is offended, so she tells her that she got money from "some admirer" so they could travel to Italy to improve Torvald's health. She told Torvald that her father gave her the money, but, in fact, she illegally borrowed it without his knowledge (women were forbidden from conducting financial activities such as signing cheques without a man's endorsement). Since then, she has been secretly working and saving up to pay off the borrowed money.

Krogstad, a lower level employee at Torvald's bank, arrives and goes into the study. Nora is uneasy when she sees him. Dr. Rank leaves the study and mentions that he feels wretched, though like everyone he wants to go on living. In contrast to his physical illness, he says that the man in the study, Krogstad, is "morally diseased".

After the meeting with Krogstad, Torvald comes out of the study. Nora asks him if he can give Kristine a position at the bank and Torvald is positive about this, saying that this is a fortunate moment, as a position has just become available. Torvald, Kristine, and Dr. Rank leave the house, leaving Nora alone. The nanny returns with the children, and Nora plays with them for a while until Krogstad creeps through the ajar door into the living room and surprises her. Krogstad tells Nora that Torvald intends to fire him from the bank and asks her to intercede with Torvald to allow him to keep his job. She refuses, and Krogstad blackmails her about the loan she took out from him for the trip to Italy; he knows that she obtained this loan by forging her father's signature after his death, a serious offence. Krogstad leaves, and, when Torvald returns, Nora tries to convince him not to fire Krogstad. Torvald refuses to hear her pleas, explaining that Krogstad is a liar and a hypocrite and that, years before, he had committed a crime: he forged other people's signatures. Torvald feels physically ill in the presence of a man "poisoning his own children with lies and dissimulation".

=== Act Two ===
Kristine arrives to help Nora repair a dress for a fancy-dress party that she and Torvald plan to attend the next day. Torvald returns from the bank, and Nora pleads with him to reinstate Krogstad, claiming she is worried Krogstad will publish libelous articles about Torvald and ruin his career. Torvald dismisses her fears and explains that, although Krogstad is a reasonable worker and seems to have turned his life around, he must be fired because he is too personally familiar with Torvald in front of other bank personnel due to their past friendship, then retires to his study to work.

Dr. Rank then arrives. Nora teases him and builds up to ask him for a favour, but Rank responds by revealing that he has entered the terminal stage of his disease and that he has always been secretly in love with her. Nora tries to deny the first revelation and make light of it but is disturbed by his declaration of love. She then clumsily attempts to tell him that she is not in love with him but loves him dearly as a friend, and never discloses the nature of the favour she had in mind to ask him.

Having been fired by Torvald, Krogstad arrives at the house. Nora convinces Dr. Rank to go into Torvald's study so he will not see Krogstad. When Krogstad confronts Nora, he declares that he no longer cares about the remaining balance of Nora's loan but that he will instead preserve the associated bond (or ’IOU’) to blackmail Torvald into not only keeping him employed but also promoting him in future. Nora explains that she has done her best to persuade her husband, but he refuses to change his mind. Krogstad informs Nora that he has written a letter detailing her crime (forging her father's signature of surety on the bond) and will put it in Torvald's letter box, which is locked.

Nora tells Kristine of her difficult situation, gives her Krogstad's card with his address, and asks her to try to convince him to relent.

Torvald enters and tries to retrieve his mail, but Nora distracts him by begging him to help her with the dance she has been rehearsing for the costume party, feigning anxiety about performing. She dances so badly and acts so childishly that Torvald agrees to spend the whole evening coaching her. When the others go to dinner, Nora stays behind for a few minutes and contemplates killing herself.

=== Act Three ===
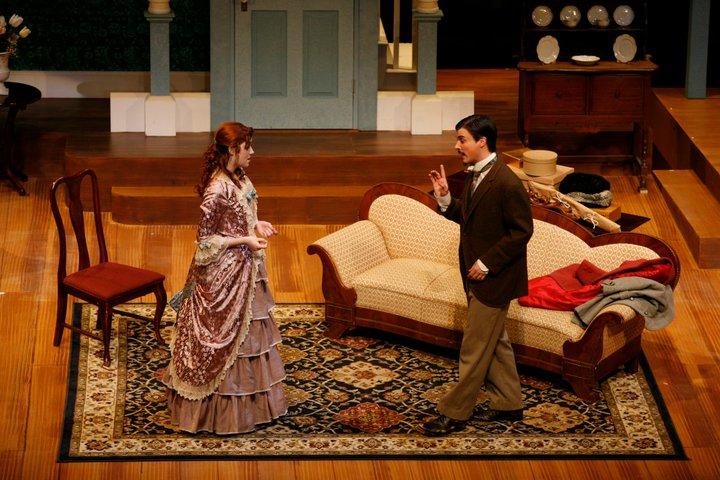
Torvald addresses Nora (from a 2012 production)

Kristine tells Krogstad that she only married her husband because she had no other means to support her sick mother and young siblings and that she has returned to offer him her love again. She believes that he would not have stooped to unethical behavior if he had not been devastated by her abandonment and in dire financial straits. Krogstad changes his mind and offers to take back his letter to Torvald. Kristine, however, decides that Torvald should know the truth for the sake of his and Nora's marriage.

Torvald drags Nora home from the party, and Rank departs, conveying obliquely to Nora that this is a final goodbye, as he has determined that his death is near. Torvald retrieves his letters. As he reads them, Nora prepares to run away for good, but Torvald confronts her with Krogstad's letter. Enraged, he declares that she is now completely in Krogstad's power; she must yield to Krogstad's demands and keep quiet about the whole affair. He berates Nora, calling her a dishonest and immoral woman and telling her that she is unfit to raise their children. He says that from now on their marriage will be only a matter of appearances.

A maid enters, delivering a letter from Krogstad to Nora, which Torvald demands to read himself. Torvald then exults that he is saved, as Krogstad has returned the incriminating bond, which Torvald immediately burns along with Krogstad's letters. He takes back his harsh words to his wife and tells her that he forgives her. Nora realizes that her husband is not the strong and gallant man she thought he was, who would protect and defend her, and that he truly loves himself more than he does Nora.

Torvald remarks when a man has forgiven his wife it makes him love her all the more since it reminds him that she is totally dependent on him, like a child. He preserves his peace of mind by thinking of the incident as a mere mistake that she made owing to her foolishness, one of her most endearing feminine traits.

Torvald, this is a settling of accounts. // In all these eight years [...], we have never exchanged a word on any serious subject.

— Nora, in Ibsen's A Doll's House (1879)

Disillusioned, Nora tells Torvald that she is leaving him because the pair have become strangers to each other and she has been treated like a doll all her life by both her father and husband. She reveals that she had hoped and expected that he would want to sacrifice his reputation for hers in this scandal and that she had planned to kill herself to prevent him from doing so. Torvald insists that she fulfill her duty as a wife and mother, which he says is more important than knowing herself, but Nora says that she has duties to herself that are just as important and that she cannot be a good mother or wife without learning to be more than just a plaything. She says she cannot return unless both she and Torvald are so changed that they are no longer strangers, which would be "the most wonderful thing of all."

Nora leaves her keys and wedding ring; Torvald breaks down and begins to cry, completely baffled by what has happened. After Nora leaves the room, Torvald, for one second, still has a sense of hope and exclaims to himself "The most wonderful thing of all—?", just before the door at the entrance to the building is heard closing.

=== Alternative ending ===
Ibsen's German agent felt that the original ending would not play well in German theatres. In addition, copyright laws of the time would not preserve Ibsen's original work. Therefore, for it to be considered acceptable, and prevent the translator from altering his work, Ibsen was forced to write an alternative ending for the German premiere. In this ending, Nora is led to her children after having argued with Torvald. Seeing them, she collapses, and as the curtain is brought down, it is implied that she stays. Ibsen later called the ending a disgrace to the original play and referred to it as a "barbaric outrage". Virtually all productions today use the original ending, as do nearly all the film versions of the play.

== Composition and publication ==
=== Real-life inspiration ===
A Doll's House was based on the life of Laura Kieler (maiden name Laura Smith Petersen), a good friend of Ibsen. Much that happened between Nora and Torvald happened to Laura and her husband, Victor. Similar to the events in the play, Laura signed an illegal loan to save her husband's life—in this case, to find a cure for his tuberculosis. She wrote to Ibsen, asking for his recommendation of her work to his publisher, thinking that the sales of her book would repay her debt. At his refusal, she forged a cheque for the money. At this point, she was found out. In real life, when Victor discovered Laura's secret loan, he divorced her and had her committed to an asylum. Two years later, she returned to her husband and children at his urging, and she went on to become a well-known Danish author, living to the age of 83.

Ibsen wrote A Doll's House when Laura Kieler had been committed to the asylum. The fate of this friend of the family shook him deeply, perhaps also because Laura had asked him to intervene at a crucial point in the scandal, which he did not feel able or willing to do. Instead, he turned this life situation into an aesthetically shaped, successful drama. In the play, Nora leaves Torvald with her head held high, though facing an uncertain future given the limitations single women faced in the society of the time.

Kieler eventually rebounded from the shame of the scandal and had her own successful writing career while remaining discontented with sole recognition as "Ibsen's Nora" years afterward.

=== Composition ===
Ibsen started thinking about the play around May 1878, although he did not begin its first draft until a year later, having reflected on the themes and characters in the intervening period (he visualized its protagonist, Nora, for instance, as having approached him one day wearing "a blue woolen dress"). He outlined his conception of the play as a "modern tragedy" in a note written in Rome on 19 October 1878. "A woman cannot be herself in modern society", he argues, since it is "an exclusively male society, with laws made by men and with prosecutors and judges who assess feminine conduct from a masculine standpoint!"

=== Publication ===
Ibsen sent a fair copy of the completed play to his publisher on 15 September 1879. It was first published in Copenhagen on 4 December 1879, in an edition of 8,000 copies that sold out within a month; a second edition of 3,000 copies followed on 4 January 1880, and a third edition of 2,500 was issued on 8 March.

== Production history ==
A Doll's House received its world premiere on 21 December 1879 at the Royal Danish Theatre in Copenhagen, with Betty Hennings as Nora, Emil Poulsen as Torvald, and Peter Jerndorff as Dr. Rank. Writing for the Norwegian newspaper Folkets Avis, the critic Erik Bøgh admired Ibsen's originality and technical mastery: "Not a single declamatory phrase, no high dramatics, no drop of blood, not even a tear." Every performance of its run was sold out. Another production opened at the Royal Dramatic Theatre in Stockholm, on 8 January 1880, while productions in Christiania (with Johanne Juell as Nora and Arnoldus Reimers as Torvald) and Bergen followed shortly after.

In Germany, the actress Hedwig Raabe refused to perform the play as written, declaring, "I would never leave my children!" Since the playwright's wishes were not protected by copyright, Ibsen decided to avoid the danger of being rewritten by a lesser dramatist by committing what he called a "barbaric outrage" on his play himself and giving it an alternative ending in which Nora did not leave. A production of this version opened in Flensburg in February 1880. This version was also played in Hamburg, Dresden, Hanover, and Berlin, although, in the wake of protests and a lack of success, Raabe eventually restored the original ending. Another production of the original version, some rehearsals of which Ibsen attended, opened on 3 March 1880 at the Residence Theatre in Munich.

In Great Britain, the only way in which the play was initially allowed to be given in London was in an adaptation by Henry Arthur Jones and Henry Herman called Breaking a Butterfly. This adaptation was produced at the Princess Theatre on 3 March 1884. Writing in 1896 in his book The Foundations of a National Drama, Jones says: "A rough translation from the German version of A Doll's House was put into my hands, and I was told that if it could be turned into a sympathetic play, a ready opening would be found for it on the London boards. I knew nothing of Ibsen, but I knew a great deal of Robertson and H. J. Byron. From these circumstances came the adaptation called Breaking a Butterfly." H. L. Mencken writes that it was A Doll's House "denaturized and dephlogisticated. [...] Toward the middle of the action Ibsen was thrown to the fishes, and Nora was saved from suicide, rebellion, flight and immorality by making a faithful old clerk steal her fateful promissory note from Krogstad's desk. [...] The curtain fell upon a happy home."

Before 1889, there were two private productions of the play in London (in its original form as Ibsen wrote it). In 1886, the first production in England took place at Eleanor Marx's lodgings in London and featured her as Nora and her friend George Bernard Shaw in the role of Krogstad; both were champions of Ibsen. The first public British production of the play in its regular form opened on 7 June 1889 at the Novelty Theatre, starring Janet Achurch as Nora and Charles Charrington as Torvald. Achurch played Nora again for a seven-day run in 1897. Soon after its London premiere, Achurch brought the play to Australia in 1889.

The play was first seen in the US in 1883 in Louisville, Kentucky; Helena Modjeska acted Nora. The play made its Broadway premiere at the Palmer's Theatre on 21 December 1889, starring Beatrice Cameron as Nora Helmer. It was first performed in France in 1894. Other productions in the US include one in 1902 starring Minnie Maddern Fiske, a 1937 adaptation with acting script by Thornton Wilder and starring Ruth Gordon, a 1971 production starring Claire Bloom, and a 1997 production starring Janet McTeer.

A new adaptation by Zinnie Harris at the Donmar Warehouse, starring Gillian Anderson, Toby Stephens, Anton Lesser, Tara FitzGerald and Christopher Eccleston opened in May 2009. This was version was set in Edwardian England.

The play was performed by 24/6: A Jewish Theater Company in March 2011, one of their early performances following their December 2010 Lower Manhattan launch.

In August 2013, Young Vic produced a new adaptation of A Doll's House directed by Carrie Cracknell based on the English language version by Simon Stephens. In September 2014, in partnership with Brisbane Festival, La Boite Theatre Company located in Brisbane, Australia, hosted an adaptation of A Doll's House written by Lally Katz and directed by Stephen Mitchell Wright. In June 2015, Space Arts Centre in London staged an adaptation of A Doll's House featuring the discarded alternate ending. 'Manaveli' Toronto staged a Tamil version of A Doll's House (ஒரு பொம்மையின் வீடு) on 30 June 2018, translated and directed by Mr P Vikneswaran. The drama was very well received by the Tamil community in Toronto and was staged again a few months later. The same stage play was filmed at the beginning of 2019 and screened in Toronto on 4 May 2019. The film was received with very good reviews, and the artists were hailed for their performance. Arrangements were made to screen the film in London, at Safari Cinema Harrow, on 7 July 2019. From September 2019 to October 2019, the Lyric Hammersmith in London hosted a new adaptation of the play by Tanika Gupta who moved the setting of the play to colonial India. Though the plot largely remained unchanged, the protagonists were renamed Tom and Niru Helmer and a conversation was added regarding the British oppression of the Indian public. One significant shift was the lack of a slamming door at the end of the play. They also published a pack of teaching materials which includes extracts from the adapted play script.

A production of A Doll's House by The Jamie Lloyd Company starring Jessica Chastain was scheduled to play at the Playhouse Theatre in London in mid-2020. Due to the COVID-19 pandemic, the play was postponed to a later date. In November 2022, it was announced that the production would instead premiere on Broadway at the Hudson Theatre. It began previews on 13 February 2023 and officially opened on 9 March, running until 10 June. It starred Chastain, Arian Moayed, Michael Patrick Thornton, and Okieriete Onaodowan.

== Analysis and criticism ==
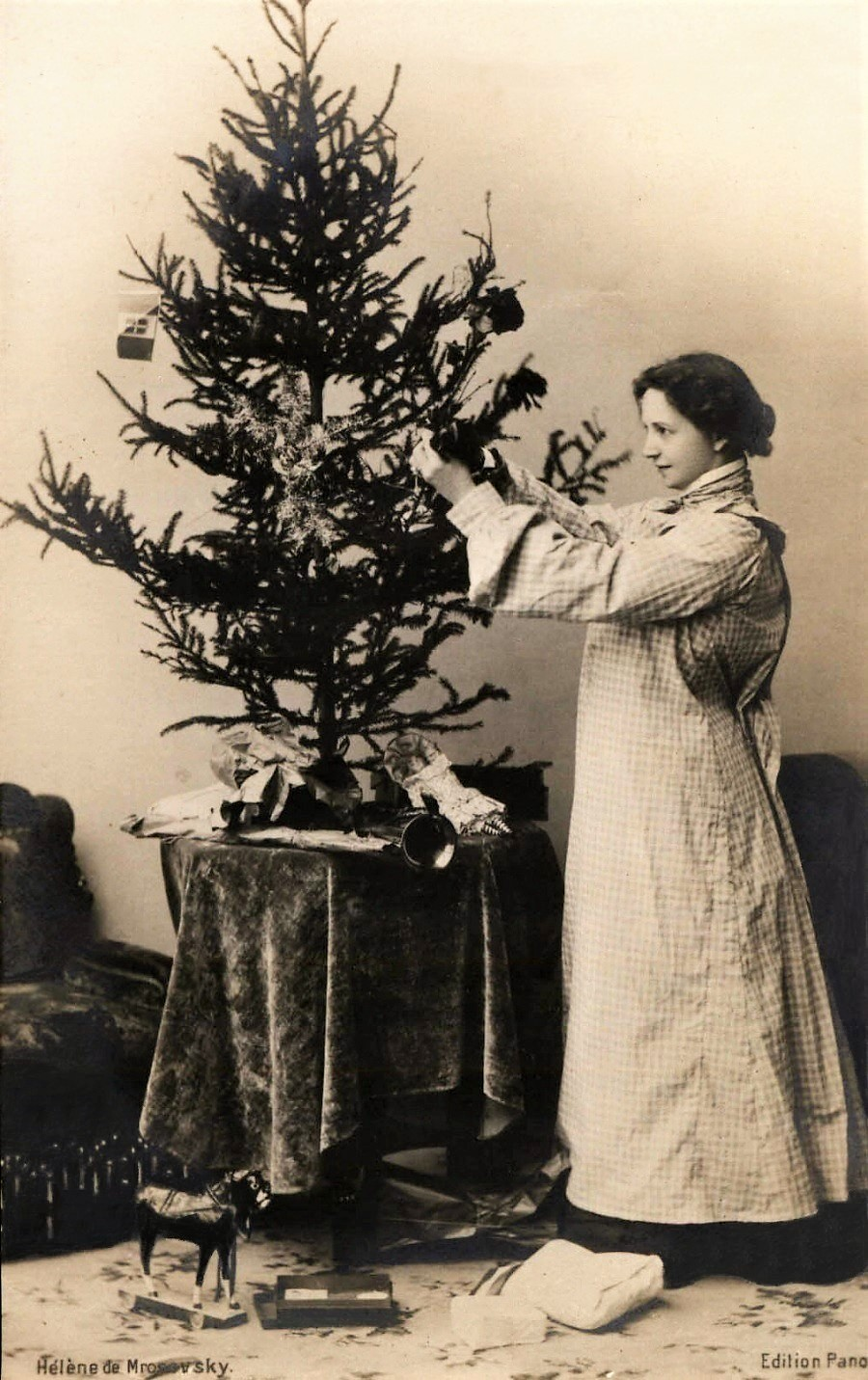
Nora (played by Vera Komissarzhevskaya) dresses the Christmas tree, 1904

A Doll's House questions the traditional roles of men and women in 19th-century marriage. To many 19th-century Europeans, this was scandalous. The covenant of marriage was considered holy, and to portray it as Ibsen did was controversial. The Irish playwright George Bernard Shaw, however, found Ibsen's willingness to examine society without prejudice exhilarating.

The Swedish playwright August Strindberg criticised the play in his volume of essays and short stories Getting Married (1884). Strindberg questioned Nora's walking out and leaving her children behind with a man that she herself disapproved of so much that she would not remain with him. Strindberg also considers that Nora's involvement with an illegal financial fraud that involved Nora forging a signature, all done behind her husband's back, and then Nora's lying to her husband regarding Krogstad's blackmail, are serious crimes that should raise questions at the end of the play, when Nora is moralistically judging her husband. Strindberg also points out that Nora's complaint that she and Torvald "have never exchanged one serious word about serious things" is contradicted by the discussions that occur in act one and two.

The reasons Nora leaves her husband are complex, and various details are hinted at throughout the play. In the last scene, she tells her husband she has been "greatly wronged" by his disparaging and condescending treatment of her, and his attitude towards her in their marriage—as though she were his "doll wife"—and the children in turn have become her "dolls", leading her to doubt her own qualifications to raise her children. She is troubled by her husband's behavior in regard to the scandal of the loaned money. She does not love her husband, feels completely confused and that they are strangers, and suggests that her issues are shared by many women. George Bernard Shaw suggests that she left to begin "a journey in search of self-respect and apprenticeship to life" and that her revolt is "the end of a chapter of human history".

Michael Meyer argued that the play's theme is not women's rights but rather "the need of every individual to find out the kind of person he or she really is and to strive to become that person". In a speech given to the Norwegian Association for Women's Rights in 1898, Ibsen insisted that he "must disclaim the honor of having consciously worked for the women's rights movement" since he wrote "without any conscious thought of making propaganda", his task having been "the description of humanity". The play, however, is associated with feminism, as Miriam Schneir includes it in her anthology Feminism: The Essential Historical Writings, labeling it as one of the essential feminist works.

Because of the departure from traditional behavior and theatrical convention involved in Nora's leaving home, her act of slamming the door as she leaves has come to represent the play itself. In Iconoclasts (1905), James Huneker noted "That slammed door reverberated across the roof of the world." Chinese writer Lu Xun evaluated the ending in the 1923 speech, What happens after Nora leaves home, in which he compares Nora's lack of economic independence to China's political and economic repression.

== Adaptations ==
=== Film ===
A Doll's House has been adapted for the cinema on many occasions, including:

- The 1922 lost silent film A Doll's House, starring Alla Nazimova as Nora.
- The 1923 German silent film Nora, directed by Berthold Viertel. Nora was played by Olga Chekhova, who was born Olga Knipper, and was the niece and namesake of Anton Chekhov's wife. She was also Mikhail Chekhov's wife.
- The 1943 Argentine film Casa de muñecas, starring Delia Garcés, which modernizes the story and uses the alternative ending.
- The 1944 German film Nora, directed by Harald Braun, which retells the story in line with Nazi ideology on the place of women, resolving it with Nora in the home.
- The 1954 Mexican film Casa de muñecas, directed by Alfredo B. Crevenna and starring Marga López, Ernesto Alonso and Miguel Torruco, sets the story in modern-day Mexico, adds a flashback framing device, turns Dr. Rank (renamed Dr. Eduardo Anguiano and played by Alonso, who gets second billing) into Nora's doomed suitor and savior, changes Nora's motivation for leaving her house, and adds a happy ending the following Christmas Eve.
- Two film versions were released in 1973: A Doll's House, directed by Joseph Losey and starring Jane Fonda, David Warner, and Trevor Howard; and A Doll's House, directed by Patrick Garland and starring Claire Bloom, Anthony Hopkins, and Ralph Richardson.
- Dariush Mehrjui's 1992 film Sara is based on A Doll's House, with the plot transferred to Iran. Sara, played by Niki Karimi, is the Nora of Ibsen's play.
- In 2012, the Young Vic theater in London released a short film titled Nora with Hattie Morahan portraying what a modern-day Nora might look like.
- In 2016, there were plans for a modernized adaptation starring Ben Kingsley as Doctor Rank and Michele Martin as Nora.

=== Television ===
- The 1959 adaptation was a live version for US TV directed by George Schaefer. This version featured Julie Harris, Christopher Plummer, Hume Cronyn, Eileen Heckart, and Jason Robards.
- In 1973, Norwegian TV produced an adaptation of A Doll's House titled Et dukkehjem, directed by Arild Brinchmann and starring Lise Fjeldstad as Nora Helmer.
- In 1974, Danish Television produced an adaptation of A Doll's House titled Et dukkehjem, reworked by Leif Panduro, directed by Palle Kjærulff-Schmidt and starring Ghita Nørby as Nora and Preben Neergaard as Thorvald. Also featuring Henning Moritzen, Hanne Borchsenius, Ove Sprogøe, and Lily Broberg.
- A 1974 West German television adaptation titled Nora Helmer was directed by Rainer Werner Fassbinder and starred Margit Carstensen in the title role.
- In 1992, David Thacker directed a British television adaptation with Juliet Stevenson, Trevor Eve, and David Calder.

=== Radio ===
- A Lux Radio Theatre production on 6 June 1938 starred Joan Crawford as Nora and Basil Rathbone as Torvald.
- A later version by the Theatre Guild on the Air on 19 January 1947 featured Rathbone again as Torvald with Dorothy McGuire as Nora.
- In 2012, BBC Radio 3 broadcast an adaptation by Tanika Gupta transposing the setting to India in 1879, where Nora (renamed 'Niru') is an Indian woman married to Torvald (renamed 'Tom'), an English man working for the British Colonial Administration in Calcutta. This production starred Indira Varma as Niru and Toby Stephens as Tom.

=== Restaging ===
- In 1989, film and stage director Ingmar Bergman staged and published a shortened reworking of the play, now entitled Nora, which entirely omitted the characters of the servants and the children, focusing more on the power struggle between Nora and Torvald. It was widely viewed as downplaying the feminist themes of Ibsen's original. The first staging of it in New York City was reviewed by The New York Times as heightening the play's melodramatic aspects. The Los Angeles Times stated that "Nora shores up A Doll's House in some areas but weakens it in others."
- In 2014, Singaporean playwright Michelle Tan adapted and localised it for Our Company, a Singapore non-profit theatre company. Tan's adaption was described by Today as an admirable localisation of Ibsen's play with "some pretty sharp writing".
- Lucas Hnath wrote A Doll's House, Part 2 in 2017, as a followup about Nora returning.
- In 2017, performance artist Cherdonna Shinatra wrote and starred in a reworking of the play titled "Cherdonna's Doll House" under the direction of Ali Mohamed el-Gasseir. The production was staged at 12th Avenue Arts through Washington Ensemble Theatre. Brendan Kiley of The Seattle Times described it as a "triple-decker satire" in which "Cherdonna's version of Ibsen's play about femininity turns into a kind of memoir about Kuehner's neither-here-nor-there career identity."
- In 2019, the Citizens Theatre in Glasgow performed Nora: A Doll's House by Stef Smith, a radical reworking of the play, with three actors playing Nora, simultaneously taking place in 1918, 1968, and 2018. The production later transferred to the Young Vic in London.
- In 2019, Samuel Adamson's reworking of the play, titled Wife, was staged at the Kiln Theatre in Kilburn, London. It sets the play in different versions covering 80 years, between 1959 and 2042.
- In 2022, Indian theatre director Amitesh Grover staged the play at the National School of Drama (India), expanding on the role of the female servants and designing an expressionistic set which collapsed on Nora's husband, Torvald Helmer, at the end of the play.
- In 2023, Amy Herzog adapted a new version of the play directed by Jamie Lloyd and starring Jessica Chastain. This Broadway production began previews on February 13, 2023, at the Hudson Theatre, opened on March 9, 2023, and closed on June 10, 2023. Globe and Mail theatre reviewer Aisling Murphy praised the 2025 production at Bluma Appel Theatre in Toronto, but criticized Herzog's script as too fond of melodrama, finding its final scene as "a little long and a little cloying, and even anachronistic in its insertion of 21st-century self-help jargon". Nonetheless, Murphy found the adaptation "zippy" and "serviceable" overall.
- In 2026, the Almeida Theatre staged an adaptation by Anya Reiss, updating the setting to modern-day London and making Torvald an asset manager. In a regressive turn, it features Nora staying with Torvald.

=== Novels & Short Fiction ===
- Walter Besant's 1890 short story, "The Doll's House and After" depicts Nora as a cold, villainous and selfish woman who, upon her departure, has become a decadent and well-off cosmopolitan novelist while Torvald and Nora's male children live lives of alcoholism and depravity. Emmy commits suicide, feeling she is unworthy to marry Krogstad's son because of her family's situation.
- In 2019, memoirist, journalist, and professor Wendy Swallow published Searching for Nora: After the Doll's House. Swallow's historical novel tells the story of Nora Helmer's life from the moment in December 1879 that Nora walks out on her husband and young children at the close of A Doll's House. Swallow draws from her research into Ibsen's play and iconic protagonist, the realities of the time, and the 19th-century Norwegian emigration to the US, following Nora as she first struggles to survive in Christiania (today's Oslo) and then travels by boat, train, and wagon to a new home in the western prairie of Minnesota.
- In 2020, playwright Lucas Hnath wrote "A Doll's House, Part 2", which depicts Nora 15 years later, having now lived the life of a feminist revolutionary, reuniting with Torvald and attempting to make amends with him.

=== Dance ===
- Stina Quagebeur's ballet Nora for the English National Ballet premiered in 2019, with Crystal Costa as Nora and Jeffrey Cirio as Torvald, set to Philip Glass's Tirol Concerto for Piano and Orchestra.

== Awards and nominations ==
=== 1971 Broadway revival ===
Year	Award	Category	Nominee	Result
1971	Drama Desk Award	Outstanding Performance	Claire Bloom	Won

=== 1975 Broadway revival ===
Year	Award	Category	Nominee	Result
1975	Tony Award	Best Actress in a Play	Liv Ullmann	Nominated
1975	Drama Desk Award	Outstanding Actress in a Play	Liv Ullmann	Nominated

=== 1997 Broadway revival ===
Year	Award	Category	Nominee	Result
1997	Tony Award	Best Revival of a Play		Won
1997	Tony Award	Best Actress in a Play	Janet McTeer	Won
1997	Tony Award	Best Featured Actor in a Play	Owen Teale	Won
1997	Tony Award	Best Direction of a Play	Anthony Page	Won
1997	Drama Desk Award	Outstanding Revival of a Play		Won
1997	Drama Desk Award	Outstanding Actress in a Play	Janet McTeer	Won
1997	Theatre World Award		Janet McTeer	Won

=== 2023 Broadway revival ===
Year	Award	Category	Nominee	Result
2023	Tony Award	Best Revival of a Play		Nominated
2023	Tony Award	Best Actress in a Play	Jessica Chastain	Nominated
2023	Tony Award	Best Featured Actor in a Play	Arian Moayed	Nominated
2023	Tony Award	Best Direction of a Play	Jamie Lloyd	Nominated
2023	Tony Award	Best Lighting Design of a Play	Jon Clark	Nominated
2023	Tony Award	Best Sound Design of a Play	Ben Ringham and Max Ringham	Nominated
2023	Drama Desk Award	Outstanding Lead Performance in a Play	Jessica Chastain	Won
2023	Drama Desk Award	Outstanding Featured Performance in a Play	Arian Moayed	Nominated
2023	Drama Desk Award	Outstanding Sound Design of a Play	Ben Ringham and Max Ringham	Won
2023	Drama Desk Award	Outstanding Adaptation	Amy Herzog	Won

== General and cited sources ==
- Brockett, Oscra G; Hildy, Franklin J (2002). History of the theatre. Boston: Allyn & Bacon. ISBN 9780205410507. OCLC 228061773.
- Dukore, Bernard F., ed. 1974. Dramatic Theory and Criticism: Greeks to Grotowski. Florence, KY: Heinle & Heinle. ISBN 978-0-03-091152-1.
- Innes, Christopher (2000). A sourcebook of naturalist theatre. London: Routledge. ISBN 0415152291. OCLC 896687433.
- Meyer, Michael (1974). Ibsen: a biography. Penguin. ISBN 9780140217728. OCLC 223316018.
- Moi, Toril (2006). Henrik Ibsen and the Birth of Modernism: Art, Theater, Philosophy. Oxford: Oxford University Press. ISBN 0199295875.
