= 24/6: A Jewish Theater Company =

Jewish-American acting troupe

24/6: A Jewish Theater Company is a contemporary acting troupe dedicated to providing Sabbath-observant Jews with an opportunity to be involved in the theater without having to compromise their religious observance; members are not required to rehearse or perform on Friday evening or Saturday afternoons.

== Origins ==
Billing itself as "New York’s first Jewish theater company dedicated to Sabbath-observant artists," 24/6 launched on December 11, 2010 with an evening of short plays called Sabbath Variations: The Splendor of Space at The Sixth Street Community Synagogue in lower Manhattan.

24/6 was co-founded by Yoni Oppenheim and Avi Soroka, who met in high school at Yeshiva University, and Jesse Freedman. The actors who are part of the current group are Leor Hackel, Ari Benjamin Hirsch, Etta Abramson, Dorit Katzenelenbogen, Judy Amar, Michal Birnbaum, Jessica Shechter and Emily Stern.

The term "24/6"originated before the formation of this Jewish theater company. A Jewish member of New York City Council, facing a tough reelection, ran advertisements saying that he "works for our community" 24/6.

== Productions ==
In March 2011 a production of A Doll's House, Henrik Ibsen's classic play, was performed by the group. In January 2014 the company performed a modern adaption of Uncle Vanya by Anton Chekhov called "TuBishVanya", incorporating Jewish and environmental themes. The show, directed by Yoni Oppenheim, featured: Avi Soroka as Vanya, Ari Benjamin Hirsch as Dr. Astrov, Judy Amar as Yelena, Leor Hackel as the Professor, Michal Birnbaum as Sonya and Jessica Shachter as Nanny. In December 2014 A Dybbuk for Two People By Bruce Myers was produced at the JCC Manhattan; starring Michal Birnbaum and Leor Hackel as Leah and Chanan.
