= Laura Kieler =

Norwegian-Danish novelist (1849–1932)

- Born: Laura Anna Sophie Müller; 9 January 1849; Tromsø, Norway
- Died: 23 April 1932 (aged 83); Ålsgårde, Denmark
- Occupation: novelist
- Spouse: Victor Kieler

Laura Kieler (born 9 January 1849 in Tromsø, Norway – died 23 April 1932 in Ålsgårde, Denmark) was a Norwegian-Danish novelist. Events from her life and marriage served as the inspiration for the character Nora Helmer in Henrik Ibsen's play A Doll's House.

== Biography ==
She was born Laura Anna Sophie Müller to Norwegian father Morten Smith Petersen von Führen and Danish mother Anna Hansine Kjerulf Müller.

When Kieler was age 19, she wrote a response to Henrik Ibsen's play Brand, Brand's Døtre, that endeared her to Ibsen and his wife. While on a trip with her mother, Laura visited Ibsen in Dresden in the summer of 1871. They became friends and nurtured her literary ambitions. He often referred to her as "the lark."

In 1873, she married Victor Kieler, a schoolteacher. The events of her marriage served as the inspiration for the character Nora Helmer in Henrik Ibsen's play A Doll's House. Kieler's husband contracted tuberculosis soon after their wedding, and like the character Nora, Laura Kieler borrowed money from a Norwegian bank under false pretenses in order to finance a trip to Italy for a cure. Kieler's husband believed that the funds came from Laura's earnings from her writing. Some years later, in a desperate attempt to repay the loan, Kieler sent a manuscript of her newest novel to Ibsen's wife and asked her to convince Ibsen to send it to his publisher. Ibsen's wife went on to tell him the full story of the bank loan and the manuscript as a whole. Ibsen felt unimpressed by the work and replied to Kieler expressing that he did not feel as though the book warranted publication. He did note to his wife, however, that this story would make an interesting play. This was Kieler's last attempt to raise the money to help pay back the loan she had borrowed. Upon hearing back from Ibsen, she became desperate–ultimately forging a check to pay back the debt. When Kieler's husband learned of the fraud, he demanded a divorce and sought to bar his wife from their children. Kieler had a nervous breakdown and entered a mental asylum for a month. It was during this time that Ibsen began writing A Doll's House. Upon being released, Kieler pleaded with her husband to take her back for the sake of her children, and he did in the end (although he did not allow her to see the children for 2 years even after taking her back as his partner). Kieler visited Ibsen one last time in 1891 to accuse him of his abuse of her in A Doll's House. They later reconciled, but Kieler never forgave Ibsen for using her life as fodder for his controversial drama.

Her later works occasionally made references to Ibsen, including her 1890 play Mænd af Ære, which first played at the Casino Theater in Copenhagen. The play featured the plight of a woman who, in a fraught relationship, was exploited by her lover for writing material in a manner reminiscent of her own previous struggle. The intro to her book Silhouetter also features a personal account of her conflicted relationship with Ibsen. Later still, she withdrew from more personally-informed novels, and made a living writing historical and religious books. In total, she wrote approximately 30 literary works in addition to her being an avid debater in several women's organization journals. There were two topics in particular that Kieler devoted herself to: oppressed ethnic minorities and the position of women. She had a street named after her in Bratislava due to her interest in Slovakia's problems surrounding these topics. She supported the women's cause through her publishing of articles and lectures and was even a delegate at the International Women's Congress in Chicago for Denmark in 1893 as well as a co-editor of the exhibition's celebratory publication. She dedicated her time to over 1,000 lectures focused on South Jutland and the oppression of those who live there.

== Bibliography ==
- Kieler, Laura (1869). Brand's Døtre (in Norwegian). J W Cappelens.
- Kieler, Laura (1879). André from Kautokeino
- Kieler, Laura (1881). Lavrekas Korhoinen
- Kieler, Laura (1882). Min Broder Amtmanden
- Kieler, Laura (1886). Enoppositionsmand
- Kieler, Laura (1887). Silhouetter (in Danish). Milo'ske boghandelsforlag.
- Kieler, Laura (1890). Mænd af Ære (in Norwegian). J W Cappelens.
- Kieler, Laura (1895). Paa post! : roman (in Danish). Odense: Milo.
- Kieler, Laura (1904). Sten Stensen til Stensbo (in Danish). Hagerup.
- Kieler, Laura (1909). Det stenholt Gods: et Sagn fra Stormnatten 1659 (in Danish). Copenhagen: Hagerup.
