= What happens after Nora leaves home =

1923 speech by Chinese writer Lu Xun

- Traditional Chinese: 娜拉走後怎樣?
- Simplified Chinese: 娜拉走后怎样?
Transcriptions
Standard Mandarin
- Hanyu Pinyin: Nàlā zǒu hòu zěnyàng?

"What Happens After Nora Leaves Home?" is a speech given by Chinese writer Lu Xun at Beijing Women's Normal College in 1923. In his speech, Lu Xun evaluated the ending of A Doll's House by Norwegian playwright Henrik Ibsen, where the heroine Nora Helmer leaves home to search for her selfhood. Concerned that people might blindly follow Nora's rebellion, Lu Xun spoke to address what he believed to be the potential dangers of doing so.

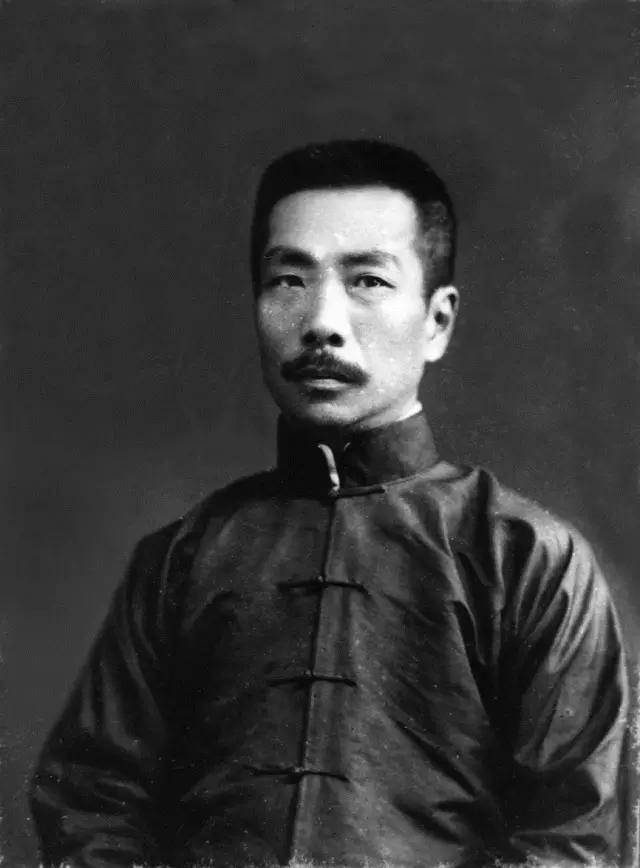
1925 image of Lu Xun

Lu Xun takes a pessimistic view on Nora's departure, stating that her follow-up options are either prostitution or a humiliating return because of her economic incapability. As his critique of Nora furthers, Lu Xun expands to discuss the general political and economic oppression facing Chinese society. He believes economic independence is the foundation of a liberated mind, and could only be achieved through radical social revolution, which will free China from all forms of enslavement. Nevertheless, he is ambiguous as to when and how the revolution will take place.

Lu Xun's emphasis on economic independence and its connection with political liberation shows his insightful observation on contemporary Chinese society. However, as later academics point out, his argument is still flawed as it overlooks the story's other characters, overemphasizes material needs over internal change, and marginalizes women's issues for nationalistic purposes. Lu Xun's 1925 short story "Regret for the Past" is considered the literary spiritual successor of his take on Nora.

== Synopsis ==
=== Henrik Ibsen's A Doll's House (1879) ===
Henrik Ibsen's 1879 play A Doll's House follows the individual awakening of Nora Helmer, wife to a bank employee named Torvald Helmer. When a scandal breaks out that threatens the livelihood of the Helmers, Torvald accuses Nora of ruining his life, contrary to his earlier promise to take on everything himself as the man of the family. After learning the scandal would be resolved secretly, Torvald is overjoyed and forgives Nora. However, Nora, who has seen Torvald's true selfish character, decides to leave. She tells Torvald that like her father, he had never known her—even she doesn't know who she really is herself. She states that she felt like a 'puppet' under Torvald's control and she needs some time to live alone to understand herself. The play ends as Nora leaves Torvald, with the door slamming on her exit from the house. The play is considered one of the best works depicting female predicament of the Western bourgeois class. Scholar Joan Templeton praised the ending, noting it 'constitutes nineteenth-century feminism's universally agreed-upon base for women's emancipation".

=== What Happens After Nora Leaves Home? (1923) ===
In the speech, Lu Xun reexamines Nora's prospect and addresses the importance of material needs, the necessity of their satisfaction as a precondition of genuine individual freedom and the social changes needed to satisfy them. At first, Lu Xun gives a summary of A Doll's House and describes it as 'social drama' that depicts the ugliness of social reality. Next, Lu Xun calls to rethink the ending of A Doll's House: 'What happens after Nora walks out?'. He suggests two possible outcomes: 'Logically, however, Nora really has only two options: to fall into degradation (prostitution) or to return home'. In his reasoning, Nora is compared to a 'caged bird' who no longer knows how to fly and cannot deal with the dangers that lie outside.

After envisioning the destined failure of Nora's future, Lu Xun continues to evaluate the psychological effectiveness of living in ignorance. At first, he affirms that it is reassuring to live in ignorance and sometimes it is essential to do so, noting that 'People who dream are fortunate. If there isn't a way out, it is important not to wake them'. To Lu Xun, to make people aware of a desperate reality only means more suffering for themselves, as there is nothing for them to do other than 'to witness their own rotting corpses'. However, he also admits that a dreamer awakened can no longer return to his dream calmly. As Nora becomes aware of her husband's manipulation, her awakening is inevitable and so is her departure.

Lu Xun then proposes that in order for Nora to avoid her destined failure, she will have to need money. He argues that a liberated mind can go nowhere without the support of material possessions. He concludes from this that for people to be able to live freely, as Nora wants to do, all members of society must be given economic rights:

'First, there must be a fair division of property between men and women in the family; second, there must be an equal division of power between men and women in society at large.'

Therefore, Lu Xun contends that the way to obtain political and economic freedom is revolution--'to fight for them' with extreme audacity and tenacity. However, he believes the pursuit for economic rights will be met with more hindrance than the advocation of political rights, as material needs are more basic for human survival than the distribution of power. A way to avoid fighting could be for economic equality to be achieved in peace within the family, as parents equally distribute family property to their offsprings to live as they will. Nevertheless, he admits this is 'rather a distant dream'. He points out that people who were oppressed as children or inferiors often nevertheless go on to oppress others themselves once they become parents or superiors, and he recommends that everyone should keep track of their experiences in order to maintain an objective attitude.

Next, Lu Xun argues that individual economic freedom 'for a few women' would not eliminate the broader systematic hierarchy of subjugation between classes. A person with means of sustenance is still affected by those with more wealth and power than her/him. Therefore, Lu Xun argues that such economic freedom is only an 'intermediate goal' leading to a more overall solution.

However, Lu Xun notes that 'it's too difficult to change China'. He attacks the inaction of the Chinese masses, saying that they have been no more than 'spectators at a play'. In consideration of this, Lu Xun urges his listeners to fight carefully and enduringly, rather than resorting to the brief sacrifice which will soon be forgotten. Nevertheless, he still has hope for China's future. With a mixed undertone, Lu Xun predicts a revolution will come eventually, but how and when he cannot tell.

== Background ==
=== Historical Background ===
Four years before Lu Xun gave his speech, the May Fourth Movement — one of the most significant social movements in China — took place in Beijing. On 4 May 1919, students gathered to protest against the signing of the Treaty of Versailles and imperial Japan's 'Twenty-One Demands', which quickly culminated into the rise of public awareness of China's national identity. The May Fourth Movement represents 'the beginning of China's modern revolutionary era, and a new stage after the Republican Revolution of 1911'. Culturally, the May Fourth Movement advocated for gexing jiefang (个性解放), 'the emancipation of individuality'. It urged reexamination of traditional Chinese values in favour of individuality. For this reason, Chinese intellectuals looked to the West for new models of ideas.

=== Reception of Ibsen: 'The Nora Compulsion' ===
Among these ideological inspirations are the works of Norwegian playwright Henrik Ibsen. As early as 1907, Lu Xun has noticed Ibsen's appeals and wrote essays to praise his play An Enemy of the People (1882). But it was not until ten years later that Ibsen's works found broader appeal among the Chinese readers. In 1918, the influential New Youth magazine dedicated an entire special issue to introduce Ibsen and his works. Comprising Ibsen's biography, reflexive essays and translation of his works (including A Doll's House, An Enemy of the People, and Little Eyolf), the issue served as a systematic guide on Ibsen's works and was enthusiastically received by Chinese readers. His plays, performed in Beijing and Shanghai, won critical and mass acclaims alike. The character of Nora, especially, sparked discussions on marital freedom as many considered her as the symbol of individuality, and a refusal to the repressive Confucian traditions. Inspired by her spirit, many young Chinese rebelled against their family and left home for the sake of individual liberation, a phenomenon coined by some as the 'Nora Compulsion' (or 'Ibsen-fever'/'Chinese Nora-ism').

Following the spreading influence of Nora's story, the topic of marital freedom and women's rights emerged under the spotlight, creating a series of "women walk out" literature. Under the inspiration of Ibsen's original work, women walk out literature became increasingly prevalent among Chinese literatures from the 1910s onward. Among medias of books, magazines, plays, and newspapers, references and acknowledgements to Nora and the concept of female emancipation gradually increased over decades since the play first came to China. The genre shared the theme of women's liberation but mostly based its settings on the Chinese society and contain a relative amount of originality.

The women walk out literature after 1949 were influenced by Left-Wing ideologies and revolutionary thoughts. Much like how the awakening of Nora was used to criticize the old society and customs, Nora Compulsion and women walk out literature were part of a social movement that created a vision of a new society with greater equality.

== Debate on Ibsen's Nora ==
=== Hu Shi's Nora ===
Accompanying the New Youth special issue was an essay written by editor Hu Shi, leading intellectual of the May Fourth Movement. The essay was entitled 'Ibsenism' ('易卜生主义', Yipushengzhuyi), where he analyzed the motifs of Ibsen's works. In Hu Shi's opinion, Ibsen's works are 'realistic', as they eloquently expose the dark side of social reality. Hu Shi incorporates Ibsen's revolutionary ideals into his critique against traditional Confucian values, denouncing 'immoral' feudal practices which hinder the liberation of individuality. Inspired by A Doll's House, Hu wrote a play named The Greatest Event in Life (1919), deemed by some as the Chinese iteration of 'the Nora-problem', with the same emphasis on individual autonomy over familial oppression. However, Hu's vision was slowly overshadowed by Lu Xun, whose interpretation of Nora would spark a series of debates on individualism, the ideology most valued by Hu and the May Fourth Movement.

Hu Shi's play The Greatest Event in Life in 1919, was very similar to the original story of Nora written by Ibsen. As a writer that was greatly influenced by the western ideologies, Hu Shi designed the plot to surround the acceptance of such ideologies when targeting the Chinese audiences. Therefore, the play was tailored to be more adhering to the Chinese society and contain an educational element within.

There were two different drafts of the play. The first draft was written in English, while the second draft was in Chinese, with changes to character designs and lines to fit the Chinese social context more closely, including more detailed mentioning of Chinese customs and superstitions in the discussions between characters. The English version was designed to target young male students who had studied abroad, received the western ideologies through education, and could understand English as audiences, while the Chinese version targeted Chinese female students that were more familiar with traditional Chinese values.The Chinese version of the show contained such a controversial theme in the Chinese society when criticizing the familial oppression and superstitions that few actresses were willing to play the main character Tian Yamei for fear of being socially reproached. Hu Shi reflected upon this difficulty as a result of the overt realism.

Although Hu Shi's play was inspired by the story of Nora, critics had noted the different identities between Nora and Tian Yamei. Nora was active in her pursuit of autonomy, whereas Tian Yamei was passive, gaining the resolution to stand up against her parents only after learning the advice of her boyfriend. In this manner, although she stood up against the traditional customs of family-decided marriage, her decision was pushed by others. Additionally, Yamei received education from abroad and was a working woman, which gave her more economic power that could prevent her from Nora's dilemma Lu Xun mentioned in his speech.

=== Lu Xun's Nora ===
Presented as a speech at a women's vocational school, Lu Xun warns against the danger of 'the Nora Compulsion'. As Lu Xun affirms the revolutionary ideal embodied by Hu Shi's Nora, he appeals his listeners to rethink its feasibility. Like Hu Shi, Lu Xun recognizes Ibsen's plays as 'social drama', pinpointing that while Ibsen depicts social injustices, he is not obliged to provide ready-made solutions. He argues that despite the feminist implication of Ibsen's works, he never wrote specifically to address the problem of women's liberation. Therefore, men and women alike should be alert of Nora's false promise.

What makes Lu Xun's Nora distinct is his emphasis on economic freedom and radical revolution. Departing from a 'socialist' perspective, Lu Xun's critique consists of three arguments: first, economic independence is most crucial to individual liberation; second, economic independence could only be achieved through radical revolution; and third, individual liberation could not be achieved unless the collective society is priorly liberated. Different from Hu Shi and Ibsen, Lu Xun highlights external factor (money) over internal awakening, expanding his argument from individual emancipation to general political liberation. As he vaguely suggests revolution as the solution, the implication is that only a comprehensive social change will liberate its individual member, not the other way around. Lu Xun's inclination for external change over internal liberation is also shown in his 1934 essay, "On Women's Liberation" (有关妇女解放, 'Youguan funü jiefang'), in which he wrote, 'when society is liberated, we ourselves will be liberated too'.

Lu Xun also criticizes the destructive power of the blind crowd, noting its preference 'to spectate' instead of 'to act'. While he believes the society will help Nora, its sympathy will expire in no time as Nora's 'novelty' wears out. In Lu Xun's opinion, Nora's departure is a show of fascination in the patriarchal eyes of the Chinese society, an actual spectacle the 'thrill-seeking masses' will eventually grow weary of. Lu Xun's critique of Nora and her spectating value shows his ambivalence of female representation in contemporary Chinese society. Lu Xun's take on Nora, as Eileen Cheng argues, is 'tempered by a deeper reflection on the implications of promoting such public visibility for women in light of Chinese social realities and the continued currency of traditional gender norms'.

=== Cao Yu's Nora ===
Chinese playwright Cao Yu (1910-1996), the chairman of the China Theatre Association, produced multiple theatrical works based on the changes in Chinese society. Many female characters under Cao Yu's hand also drew inspiration from Ibsenism and the story of Nora. As a middle school student in 1928, Cao Yu had played Nora, and over the decades, his works had been influenced by Ibsenism and the ideologies of the May Fourth Movement while also containing an element of tragedy unique to the Chinese social context.

Major works by Cao Yu, including Thunderstorm (1934), Sunrise (1937), and Peking Man (1940), focused on female characters that both were inspired by and expanded on the character of Nora, who left their husbands out of frustration and despair. Specifically, the character Chen Bailu in Sunrise has been described by critics as a fulfillment of Lu Xun's two options for Nora: prostitution or a humiliating return. Chen Bailu chooses prostitution, which provides her with the economic stability to refuse a return.

=== Limitation of Lu Xun's interpretation ===
However, some have pointed out what they consider to be limitations of Lu Xun's critique. Several scholars argue that Nora is able to survive without her husband's support. As Zheng Hansheng points out, Nora already exhibits traits of decisiveness as she refuses to succumb to the threat of her debtor. Before she leaves the house, her independent character has already formed during the events of the play. Moreover, some note that a role model already exists in the play: Nora's old friend Mrs. Linde, whose self-reliance proves a life of independence is possible in the contemporary social climate. Additionally, Chien Ying-Ying contends against Lu Xun's favour for external change over internal awakening, arguing that 'without internal change, even if they have money, Chinese women would still be puppets and dolls, both at home and in society at large.'

It has also been contended that Lu Xun's interpretation inappropriately marginalizes women's issues in contemporary China and diverts from a feminist interpretation of Nora. According to these critiques, Lu Xun considers women's fate as subordinate to the fate of contemporary China and his criticisms on gender oppression are, like those of Hu Shi and many other May Fourth male writers, framed within the nationalistic presumption that women need to find their own agenda in order for China to advance. Therefore, both Lu Xun and Hu Shi's interpretations are claimed to suffer from a gendered nationalistic appropriation, making their Nora results of 'sympathetic male intuition'. These critics conclude that the lack of female intellectual opinions in the Nora debates calls for further consideration for gendered biases.

== Nora's influence on Lu Xun's literary practice ==
In 1925, Lu Xun wrote a short story, "Regret for the Past", which follows a young couple's disillusionment of reality after they rebel against their own families. "Regret for the Past" is considered as a direct literary successor of Lu Xun's perspective on Nora. Instead of focusing on unequal marital relationship like Ibsen did, Lu Xun addresses the evil of Chinese feudal family system and emphasizes on the importance of economic independence. The story has been criticised along some of the same lines as Lu Xun's Nora critique, as it has been accused of having a male-centered narrative. According to Stephen Chan, the heroine Zijun in "Regret for the Past" is the empty 'other' that exists only to be objectified for the male self's (her husband Juanshen's) reflection, as 'no authentic discourse for the other is represented'.

== See also ==
- Lu Xun
- May Fourth Movement
- Hu Shi
- New Youth
- Republic of China
- New Women
