= Nora Helmer =

Character in the play A Doll's House

- A Doll's House character
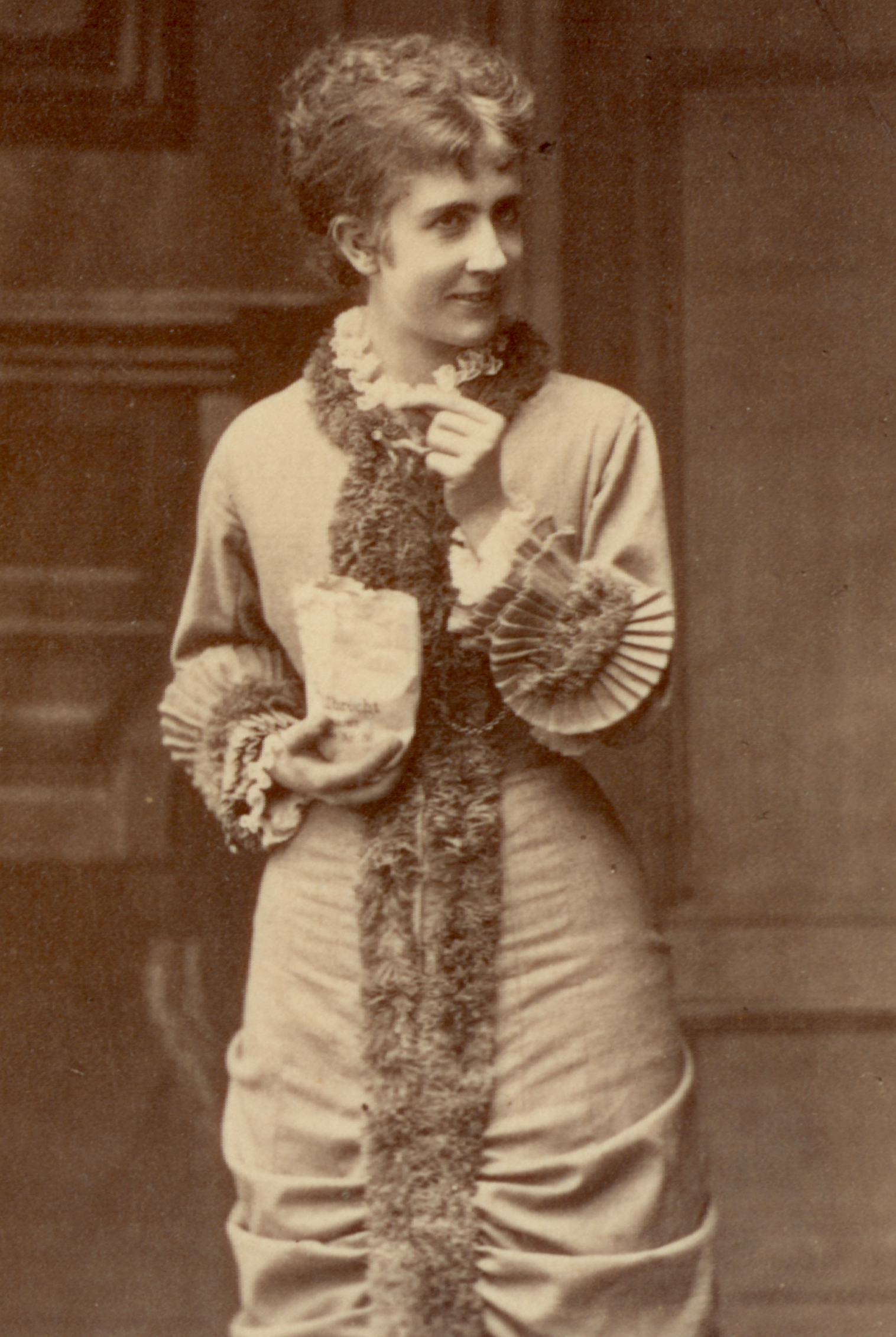
- Nora Helmer as portrayed by Betty Hennings in the Royal Danish Theatre (1879)
- First appearance: A Doll's House (1879)
- Created by: Henrik Ibsen
- Based on: Laura Kieler

In-universe information
- Gender: Female
- Occupation: Housewife
- Spouse: Torvald Helmer
- Children: 3
- Nationality: Norwegian

Nora Helmer is a fictional character in Henrik Ibsen's 1879 play A Doll's House. She is introduced as a seemingly devoted wife and mother, living in a comfortable middle-class home with her husband Torvald, a recently promoted bank manager, and their three children. After committing forgery to pay for her husband's medical treatment without his knowledge, Nora attempts to deal with the consequences that threaten her marriage.

Nora is based on Laura Kieler, a Norwegian journalist and close friend of Ibsen's, who also allegedly committed forgery in order to finance a trip to Italy. Nora's character sparked significant controversy upon the play's release, particularly due to her decision to abandon her domestic life, which challenged 19th-century gender norms. Over time, she has been reinterpreted as a feminist icon and a heroine symbolizing women's struggle for autonomy and self-determination. Her characterization inspired literary and political discussions worldwide, influencing debates on gender roles, marriage, and individual freedom, particularly in early feminist movements and 20th-century Chinese intellectual discourse.

== Fictional character biography ==
Nora met her future husband, Torvald Helmer, whilst he was a civil servant investigating her father's business ventures. She later married him and had three children. Early into their marriage, Torvald became seriously ill, and doctors advised him to stay in a region with a warmer climate. Nora secretly borrows the money from Torvald's colleague, lawyer Nils Krogstad, in order to finance the family's one year stay in Italy, and forges her dying father's signature whilst doing so. Nora saves the allowance she receives from her husband to pay back her debt to Krogstad. Eight years later, at the beginning of the play, Torvald has recovered and Nora is presented as living a contented life as a housewife and mother, with Torvald having several affectionate pet names for her, including "skylark", "squirrel", and "little bird". Nora and Torvald live a seemingly idyllic middle class life, being "reasonably wealthy but not formidably rich". Torvald has recently gotten a promotion and is now the bank manager, to Nora's joy. Nora's longtime friend, Mrs. Linde, arrives at their house, requesting a job at Torvald's bank. Nora persuades Torvald to give her a job, which he does, replacing Krogstad with her.

Soon afterwards, Krogstad arrives at the Helmers' home, enraged over losing his position at the bank, which has now been promised to Mrs. Linde. He threatens to expose Nora's secret, her forgery, unless his job is reinstated. Though Nora is distraught, she remains hopeful that Torvald's affection will compel him to protect her by taking the blame himself. At one point, she contemplates borrowing money from Dr. Rank, a longtime family friend, but abandons the idea after he confesses his romantic feelings for her and reveals he is terminally ill. Nora tries to prevent Torvald from checking the letterbox, where Krogstad has left a letter revealing her secret, by asking him to coach her as she rehearses the tarantella. Following her performance of the dance at a friend's house, Mrs. Linde asks Krogstad to not withdraw the letter, forcing Nora to admit her crime to Torvald. When Torvald discovers Nora's deception and the forgery through the letter, he is enraged, and blames her for damaging his reputation. Soon after, Mrs. Linde, revealed to be Krogstad's former lover, convinces him to withdraw his threats. Although Torvald now forgives Nora and declares that they can continue to live together as usual, Nora realizes that her marriage is not what she thought it was. After a conversation with Torvald, she decides that the she must leave her husband and children and go out into the world alone to "bring herself up". The play ends with the door slamming behind her as she steps out.

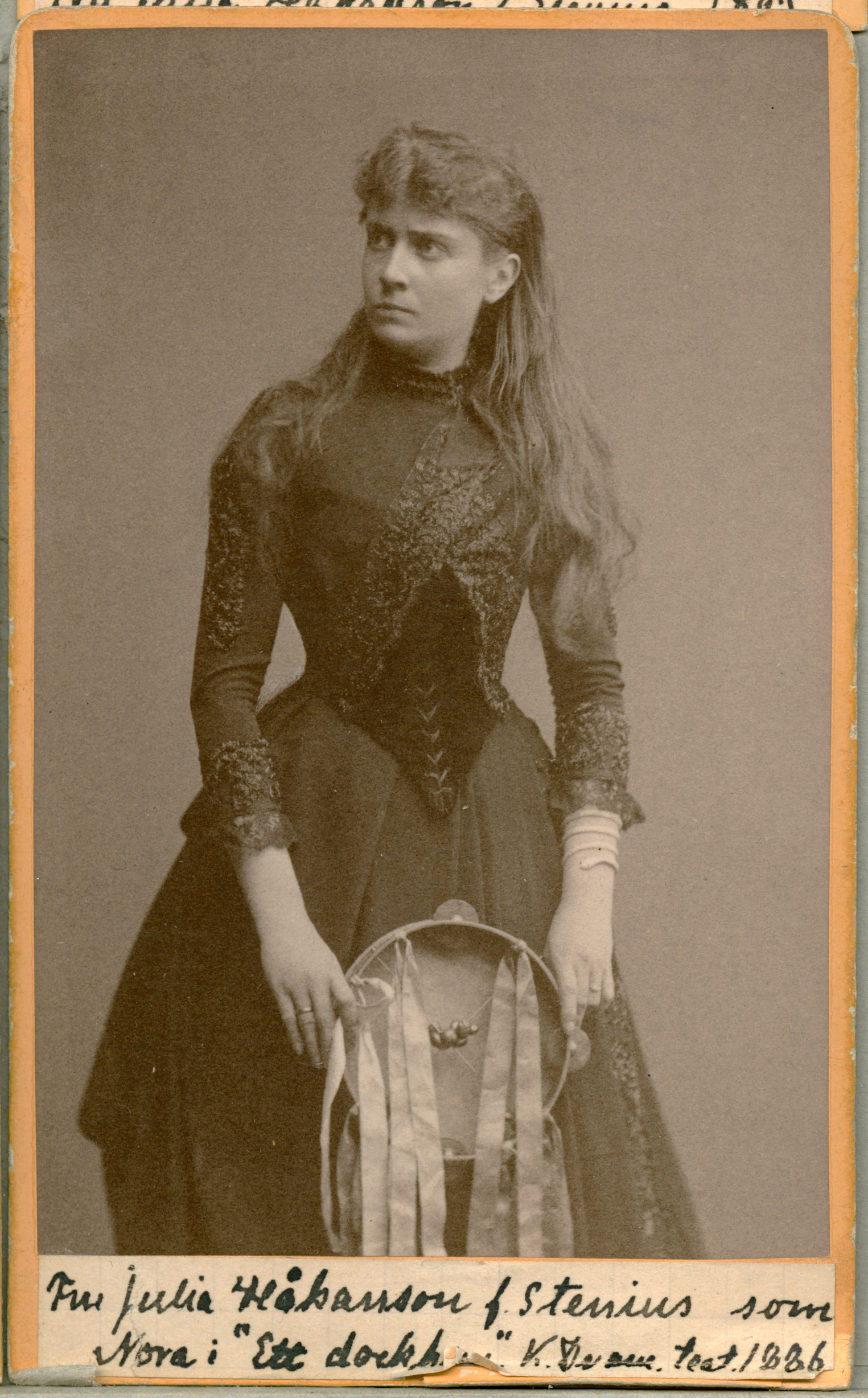
Julia Håkansson portraying Nora in the Royal Dramatic Theatre in 1886

== Creation ==
Ibsen's inspiration for the character of Nora Helmer was his close friend, Norwegian journalist Laura Kieler. Kieler admired Ibsen's works and wrote a feminist novel, Brand's Daughters, inspired by Ibsen's play Brand. Ibsen corresponded with Kieler in 1870, and they first met in person the following year. Kieler secretly borrowed money to finance a journey to Italy, having been advised to be in a warmer climate, in order for her husband to recover from tuberculosis, with Ibsen claiming she forged a check whilst doing so. Kieler's husband, Victor, went on to live a further forty years. On discovering the crime, Victor divorced her and placed her in a lunatic asylum. She was discharged after a month and reconciled with her husband. Kieler later denied committing forgery, and asked Ibsen to publicly state such, which he declined. The academic Sally Ledger, who wrote a biography on Ibsen, wrote "while A Doll's House made Ibsen famous, it brought Kieler no joy".

== Reception and analysis ==
Nora Helmer was the subject of immense controversy upon the debut of the original play due to her leaving her husband and children at the end of the play. Some contemporary critics viewed Nora as a "spoiled brat whose decision to leave her home and family is just playacting". The play and its ending became the subject to extensive discussions as to the morality of Nora, and the "right way" to end a play. In Germany, the ending was discussed extensively and several alternate endings were proposed. The implications of Nora's forgery were also extensively discussed, particularly whether it would be moral to sue Nora for her forgery. The ending became subject to scrutiny as to if it was realistic for Nora to leave her life behind. Newspapers in Europe held mock "trials" to determine whether Nora was guilty of forgery. The Danish newspaper Fædrelandet found Nora not guilty, while the German newspaper Die Gegenwart found Nora guilty of the crime.

In September 1911, the first Japanese staging of A Doll's House was conducted by Tsubouchi Shōyō's Literary Society in a small theatre. The same month, a feminist literary organization named Seitõsha was established, with journalists labelling the women in the organization as "Japanese Noras", dismissing them as frivolous and immature. Sawada Bushõ for Fujin kurabu, a Japanese women's magazine, presented Nora as a warning rather than a role model, although he praised Ibsen for creating a sympathetic character. He blamed individualism and female education for creating "so many pitiful awakened women". Several critics were unable to understand Nora's decision to leave her home, concluding that she was mistress to another man. Asai Shõzõ, a dean at Japan Women's College, called the ending "dangerous" and dismissed it as a theatrical stunt. The Japanese professor Ukita Kazutami gave a lecture, later entitled "Nora and the Woman Problem", stating that Nora's decision to leave her family was radical and not within Japanese social norms. He also argued that men and women were both needed for society to function, and that Nora had "missed the whole point" by thinking she could survive on her own.

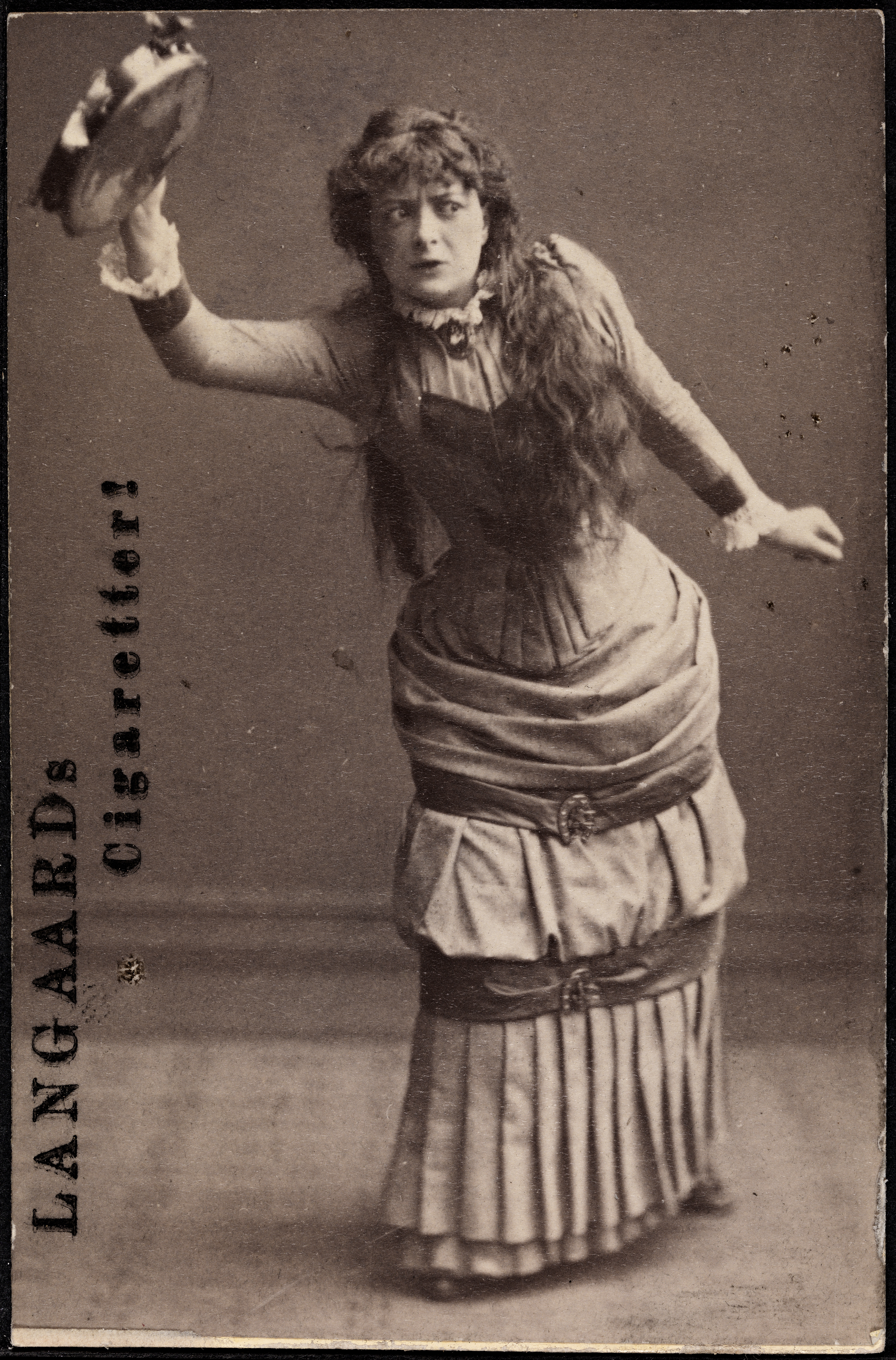
Adelaide Johannesen portraying Nora, from a cigarette card of c. 1880 – c. 1882

Hiratsuka Raichō, founder of women's literary magazine Seitō, responded to Nora's character in a review titled "Dear Nora". She criticized Nora's lack of self-awareness and naivety, and believed that Nora had yet to awaken to her true self by the end of the play. Katō Midori gave Nora a more positive review, believing Nora to be self aware from the beginning, choosing to hide it in front of Torvald. Ueda Kimi in her article "Reading A Doll House" praised the depiction of Nora's lack of agency and autonomy, stating "the beautiful Nora who was loved like a doll never had a chance to see her own self", believing that Nora found her true self by the end of the play.

Nora's departure from her domestic life has been a focal point in feminist literary analysis, particularly regarding gender roles and society. Her character has been described as a construction of the ideal woman serving the interests of a contemporary male society by academic Michael Robinson. Joan Templeton, in her article "The Doll House Backlash: Criticism, Feminism, and Ibsen," addresses the debates surrounding Nora's role as a feminist icon. Templeton discusses how some critics perceive Nora as inconsistent or unwomanly, while others view her as a symbol of women's emancipation. Academic Arthur Ganz wrote that Nora was "consumed by the desire for love". Barbara Leavy in her book In Search of the Swan Maiden: A Narrative on Folklore and Gender noted that Nora appeared to have been modelled after the archetype of a swan maiden. In the decades following the play's release, Nora Helmer has frequently been described as a heroine, (Note: Attributed to several sources, including (Hrybyk 1983, p. 42), (Bird 1980, p. 106), (Lowy 2004, p. 75), (Tufts 1986, p. 140), and (Zucker 1943, p. 309)) and was also referred to as a "feminist goddess" by Leavy. Chinese scholar Hu Shih likened Nora to the "ultimate rebel" because of her will to achieve liberation from oppression.

Nora has been the subject to significant debates amongst critics on whether Nora's transformation throughout the play signifies a shift from feminine qualities to masculine ones. Tone Selboe argued that Nora took a "male position" whilst committing forgery and borrowing money, and she played a "child-woman" role to conceal her crimes. Nora leaving her house has been interpreted as a sign of individualism and liberation of women. Michael Gelber proposed that Mrs. Linde giving up her independent life to be with Krogstad at the end of the play was symbolic of what Nora wanted, "a sense of self-fulfillment in love". Nora has also drawn comparasion to Hedda Gabler from the eponymous play, also written by Ibsen. Nora Helmer dancing the tarantella is one of the most discussed scenes of the play. Anne Marie Rekdal and Kjetil Myskja for the Scandinavian studies journal saw the dance as depicting the climax of Nora's "display of beauty", and the scene as Nora's way of postponing the inevitable crisis of Torvald discovering her forgery. In the play, Nora's performance is noted as being frantic, dancing "as if her life depended on it". Robert Lambert for The English Journal saw Nora's "frenzied twitching" as a metaphor for death spasms following her intended suicide.

Vicki Mahaffey for the South Central Review also described the dance as frenzied, and a metaphor for the internal struggles of Nora. She noted the dance as being wordless, an expression of Nora's fear. Some critics, such as Daniel Haakonsen, saw the dance as an expression of playfulness and irresponsibility. Haakonsen saw no direct links between Nora's transformation and dance, with some critics such as Raymond Williams seeing it as a theatrical element. Errol Durbach in A Doll's House: Ibsen's Myth of Transformation interpreted the dance as a "relinquishment and death to her doll-like existence". The tarantella has also been interpreted as Nora role-playing as a romantic heroine in European plays. Nora Helmer's character inspired several other characters in Chinese theatre, novels, and short stories, mostly rebellious women yearning for freedom and leaving arranged marriages for free love.

== Political influence ==
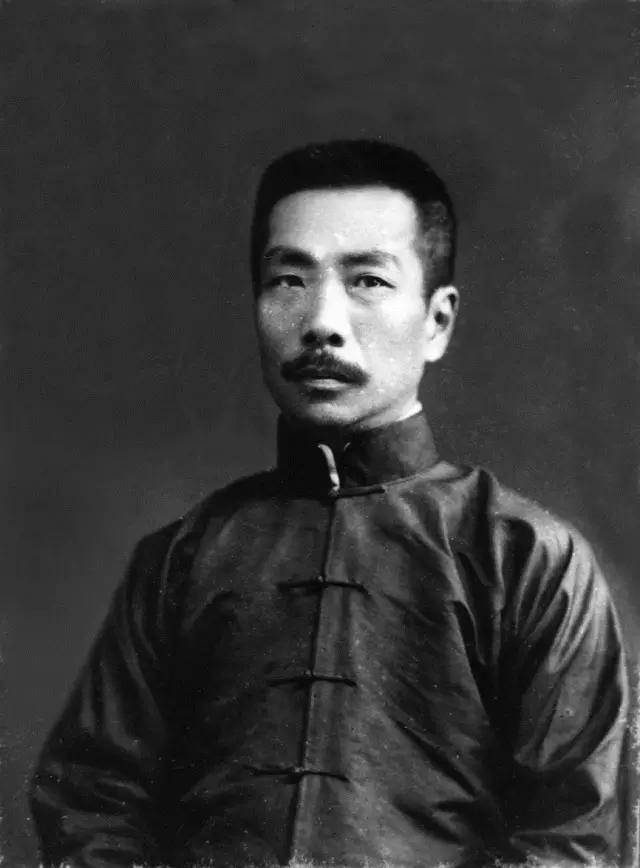
Chinese writer Lu Xun (pictured) gave the famous speech "What happens after Nora leaves home" in 1923

Nora Helmer sparked debates about gender roles across Europe, the United States, and Japan. In China, the example of Nora fueled radical intellectuals and the discussion of women's roles in China. A Doll's House was translated during the May Fourth Movement in the hope of accelerating liberation for Chinese women, and was performed in Shanghai. She later became a symbol for the movement. Nora was known as "Nuola" in the country. At the time, calls for women's emancipation had been growing, and was a symbolic hope for wider liberation. Nora came to symbolize a refusal of "Confucian morality" and as a champion of individualism. She was likened to a "monkey performing in an arena" in her relationship with Torvald. In 1923, Nora was subject of the famed speech "what happens after Nora leaves home" by Chinese writer Lu Xun. Lu focuses on Nora's economic and social fate after the play's end, comparing Nora to a "caged bird" and surmising that she would "go to the bad", by falling into moral ruin, or return to her husband. Lu used Nora as a symbol for the oppressed Chinese women of the time.

In 1935, the example of Nora was a theme in progressive intellectuals' opposition to Chiang Kai-shek's New Life Movement, in which women were called to return to the home as virtuous wives and good mothers. When the actress who played Nora in one leftist theatre troupe's production was fired from the school where she worked, the retaliatory firing became known as the "Nora incident" and was discussed in the media and intellectual circles. In 1942, the Chinese Communist Party published Guo Moruo's essay The Answer to Nora. Guo's essay responded to Lu Xun's speech "what happens after Nora leaves home," stating, "Where should Nora go after she leaves the doll's house? She should study and acquire the skills to live independently; fight to achieve women's emancipation in the context of national liberation; take on women's responsibilities in national salvation; and not fear sacrificing her life to accomplish these tasks -- these are the right answers."

== Notable portrayals ==
The first person to portray Nora was actress Betty Hennings on 21 December 1879, at the premiere of the play. Her portrayal of the character was initially seen as falling into "two parts"; in her early performances, Nora's departure was depicted as abrupt and emotionally fraught, while in later performances, Hennings presented the transformation as a natural and inevitable progression. Janet Achurch's 1889 portrayal of Nora, with her husband Charles Charrington as Torvald, helped to popularise Ibsen in England. Achurch's performance received acclaim from critics of the time. Sumako Matsui, considered Japan's first modern actress, portrayed Nora in 1911 in a production by the Literary Society. Her performance was well-received and considered revolutionary as it marked the first time a woman played a major role on a stage in Japan. A contemporary reviewer attributed her performance as solving "Japan's actress problem", and credited it with having liberated women on the stage.

=== Film ===
Year	Title	Actress	Director	Ref.
1918	A Doll's House	Elsie Ferguson	Maurice Tourneur	
1922	A Doll's House	Alla Nazimova	Charles Bryant	
1959	A Doll's House	Julie Harris	George Schaefer	
1973	A Doll's House	Claire Bloom	Patrick Garland	
1973	A Doll's House	Jane Fonda	Joseph Losey	
1992	A Doll's House	Juliet Stevenson	David Thacker	

=== Plays ===
List of actors
Year	Title	Actress	Adapter	Notes	Ref.
1879	A Doll's House	Betty Hennings	Henrik Ibsen	(Note: Premiere of the play.)	
1889	A Doll's House	Beatrice Cameron	Richard Mansfield		
1890	A Doll's House	Beatrice Cameron	Richard Mansfield		
1899	A Doll's House	Janet Achurch	William Archer		
1911	A Doll's House	Sumako Matsui	Tsubouchi Shōyō		
1936	A Doll's House	Tore Segelcke			
1937	A Doll's House	Ruth Gordon	Thornton Wilder		
1975	A Doll's House	Liv Ullmann	Tormod Skagestad		
1982	A Doll's House	Cheryl Campbell	Adrian Noble		
1982	A Doll's Life	Betsy Joslyn	Harold Prince	(Note: Sequel to the original play.)	
1982	A Doll House	Mary McDonnell	Emily Mann		
1988	Nora	Joyce Fideor	Ingmar Bergman		
1997	A Doll's House	Janet McTeer	Anthony Page		
2009	A Doll's House	Gillian Anderson	Zinnie Harris		
2009	Nora	Maja Izetbegović	Haris Pašović		
2012	A Doll's House	Hattie Morahan	Carrie Cracknell		
2017	A Doll's House, Part 2	Laurie Metcalf	Lucas Hnath	(Note: Sequel to the original play written by Lucas Hnath, and set 15 years after the conclusion.)	
2017	Cherdonna's Doll House	Leah Salcido Pfenning; Cherdonna Shinatra	Cherdonna Shinatra		
2019	Wife	Sirine Saba	Samuel Adamson	(Note: Nora is portrayed under the name Suzannah.)	
2019	Nora: A Doll's House	Amaka Okafor (1918); Natalie Klamar (1968); Anna Russell–Martin (2018)	Stef Smith	(Note: The play portrays Nora in the years 1918, 1968, and 2018, each portrayal having a different actress.)	
2023	A Doll's House	Jessica Chastain	Jamie Lloyd		
2023	A Doll's House	Vaishnavi CG	Tanika Gupta; Olivia Chakraborty	(Note: Nora is portrayed under the name Niru.)	
