= Natalie Hennedige =

Singaporean artistic director (born 1974)

Natalie Hennedige (born 1974) is the artistic director of Cake Theatrical Productions, a contemporary performance company based in Singapore. She is a recipient of the National Arts Council Young Artist Award in 2007 and the JCCI Singapore Foundation Culture Award in 2010. Natalie conceptualises, writes and directs works in theatre and other media. She also constantly collaborates with artists from across disciplines such as visual arts, film and video, performance art and dance. Natalie engineers contemporary works that are artistically adventurous and that defy classification, playing at conventional performance venues, unusual spaces of creative experimentation and in public spaces to create performance-based experiences.

== Early life ==
Hennedige was born 1974 in Singapore to an upper-class family. Her father is a Tanjong Katong-based dentist of Sinhalese ancestry and her mother, Irene, is a former businesswoman who ran a dental goods business. Hennedige has four younger sisters, three of which are doctors and one of which is a New York-based lawyer. As a child, Hennedige resided in Mountbatten with her family.

She studied at Victoria Junior College.

== Career ==
Hennedige made her first play, A Matter of Potency, while at junior college. After her stints at TheatreWorks and The Necessary Stage, two theatre companies where she directed and starred in many plays, Hennedige established her own performance company, Cake Theatrical Productions, usually shortened to just Cake, in 2005. In 2007, Hennedige was awarded the National Arts Councils' Young Artist Award. Hennedige "poured her savings into Cake" and up till 2011, the company's headquarters were situated at her father's dental clinic.

With Cake, she has written and directed over 35 works for theatre and film. These works are highly theatrical and pop with elaborate set, props, costume and multimedia. She is known for her unique contemporary style.

In recent years, Natalie Hennedige has been re-imagining the classics with works like Ophelia (2016), Electra (2017), Medea (2018), and most recently Rubber Girl on the loose (2019), based on Sophocles' Antigone, , giving voice to the transgressive women of history.

Natalie Hennedige is also the artistic director of Running with Strippers. Its initial inception began in 2011 as Decimal Points, a space for artists from a range of disciplines to make performances from the vantage point of their unique artistic perspective. This was Cake's commitment to experimentation, to show alternative. In 2015, Cake stripped their former studio bare to host the first iteration of Running with Strippers. Since then, Strippers has grown to embody the germination of ideas in arid spaces. They saw a necessity to wrestle out of the ennui that threatens to cloud the creative space, that pushes risk, experimentation, defiance and stubbornness out of the picture, giving way to lethargy, fear and ease. Strippers has grown to become a resistance against institution, coercion, the status quo - ambling along like a nomad, occupying odd non-spaces; un-defined insignificant vacant spaces, and moving on. The more momentum it garnered, the more Strippers defined for itself what it wanted, the proliferation of the fiercely alternative in the arts.

== Plays ==
- Animal Vegetable Mineral (2005) – playwright and director
- Queen Ping (2006) – playwright and director
- CHEEK (2006) – playwright and director
- Divine Soap (2006) – director
- Nothing (2007) – playwright and director
- y grec (2007) – director
- Temple (2008) – playwright and director
- Flare (2008) – director
- Destinies of Flowers In the Mirror (2009) – director
- The Comedy of the Tragic Goats (2009) – playwright
- Cuckoo Birds (2009, 2010) – director
- Invisibility/Breathing (2010) – director
- Utter "Thirteen Ways of Looking and Other Observations" (2011) – director and curator
- Decimal Points 0.01 (2011) – playwright
- Decimal Points 7.7 (2012) – playwright
- Illogic (2013) – playwright and director
- Raj and The End of Tragedy (2014) - director
- Running with Strippers (2015) - artistic director
- Versus (2015) - director
- Ophelia (2016) - playwright and director
- Being Haresh Sharma (2017) – director
- Electra (2017) - playwright and director
- Running with Strippers: Thou Shall Not (2017) - artistic director
- Medea (2017, 2018) - playwright and director
- A Litany of Broken Prayer and Promise (2017, 2018) – playwright and director
- Temple (2018) - playwright and director
- Running with Strippers: On the Rocks (2018) - artistic director
- Rubber Girl on the loose (2019) - playwright and director
- Running with Strippers: Rave (2019) - artistic director

== Telemovie ==
- Desire (2014) – playwright and director

== Awards ==
2015 12th Annual BOH Cameronian Arts Awards: “Best Director” (Raj & The End of Tragedy)

2014 Cultural Fellowship | National Arts Council

2010 JCCI Singapore Foundation Culture Award

2010 8th Annual BOH Cameronian Arts Awards: “Best Director” (Cuckoo Birds)

2009 Life! Theatre Awards: ‘Best Costume Design’ (Temple)

2008 Life! Theatre Awards: ‘Production of the Year’ (Nothing)

2008 Life! Theatre Awards: ‘Best Director’ (Nothing)

2007 National Arts Council Young Artist Award (Theatre)

2007 Life! Theatre Awards: ‘Best Sound Design’ (Queen Ping)

2007 Life! Theatre Awards: ‘Best Costume Design’ (Queen Ping)
