= Aw family =

Aw Boon Haw family
- Traditional Chinese: 胡文虎家族
Transcriptions

The Aw family is the family of Aw Chu Kin and his descendants. Aw Chu Kin started his business in then Burma, which his two sons expanded into a multi-national conglomerate that ranged from Chinese medicines to newspapers, as well as banks, insurance and real estate.

== Decline and takeovers ==
However, the family started to decline in the third generation, on the takeover of the family-owned listed company Haw Par Brothers International in Singapore in 1971, which saw Sin Poh (Star News) Amalgamated, Chung Khiaw Bank and Haw Par Brothers (Thailand) spin off from the listed company. Before the dismantling, the key position of the business empire was served by third-generation member and their spouse, who were removed after the takeover. However, Sally Aw, granddaughter of founder Aw Chu Kin, remained an influential media tycoon in Hong Kong in 1990s, until forced to sell her Sing Tao Holdings in 1999 due to financial difficulties.

In 1985, the family owned Haw Par Villa was given to the government of Singapore.

== Members ==
Note: starting from the fourth generation, not all member are listed

=== First generation ===
- Aw Chu Kin (Chinese: 胡子欽)

=== Second generation ===
- Aw Boon Leng (Chinese: 胡文龍) eldest brother, died at young age
- Aw Boon Haw (Chinese: 胡文虎), have 4 wives, 7 sons and 2 daughters
- Aw Boon Par (Chinese: 胡文豹)

=== Third generation ===
- Dato Aw Kow (Chinese: 胡蛟) D.K.L.P., B.B.M., adopted son of Aw Boon Haw; he was the managing director of Sin Chew Jit Poh and the owner of Eastern Sun; he was invited to the Fujian Provincial Assembly in 1947; he married Tan (Chinese: 陳家裕, also known as Datin Aw Kow), daughter of a pastor from the Methodist church; she chaired Eastern Sun. He died on 1 March 1982
- Aw Swan (Chinese: 胡山): general manager of Sin Poh (Star News) Amalgamated of Singapore in 1971–72; removed from the position in Sin Poh Amalgamated (Hong Kong) in 1952; renounced by Aw Boon Haw as adopted son in 1952
- Aw Hoe (Chinese: 胡好): managing director of Singapore Tiger Standard, died in a plane crash in January 1951, adopted son of Aw Boon Haw
- Sally Aw (Aw Sian, Chinese: 胡仙) O.B.E., adopted daughter of Aw Boon Haw, chairwoman of Sing Tao Holdings until 1999; she replaced Aw Swan to manage Sing Tao since 1952
- Dato Aw It Haw (Chinese: 胡一虎) D.P.M.S., son of Aw Boon Haw, chairman of Haw Par Brothers (Private) Limited after the death of his cousin Aw Cheng Chye in August 1971, director of Sin Chew Jit Poh (Singapore) Limited and Chung Khiaw Bank; first person in the Malay Peninsula to fly a plane solo from England to Singapore (5,000 km) in 1958; died in 1995
- Aw Jee Haw (Chinese: 胡二虎), son of Aw Boon Haw, killed during WW2 by Japanese bombs at young age
- Aw Sar Haw (Chinese: 胡三虎), son of Aw Boon Haw, died at young age
- Aw Sin Haw / Aw Si Haw / Aw See Haw (Chinese: 胡四虎), son of Aw Boon Haw
- Aw Seng (Chinese: 胡星), daughter of Aw Boon Haw

- Dato Aw Cheng Chye (Chinese: 胡清才) S.P.M.J., B.B.M., son of Aw Boon Par, chairman of Haw Par Brothers (Private), Haw Par Brothers International, Sin Poh (Star News) Amalgamated and director of Chung Khiaw Bank and many companies. Married to Tay Chwee Sian (Datin Aw Cheng Chye), director of Sin Chew Jit Poh (Singapore) Limited from 1975 to 1978
- Aw Cheng Taik (Chinese: 胡清德), son of Aw Boon Par, managing director of Singapore Tiger Standard after the death of Aw Hoe; was general manager in 1950. Still served as a director of charity organization "Haw Par Music Foundation Limited", founded by Sally Aw as of 2017.
- Aw Cheng Hu (Chinese: 胡清河, also known as Datin Lee Chee Shan, or Emma Aw), eldest daughter of Aw Boon Par, married to Dato Lee Chee Shan (Chinese: 李志城), first cousin once removed of Aw Boon Haw, the lifetime president (managing director) of Chung Khiaw Bank until he was retired in July 1971, Lee died in 1986. Aw Cheng Hu was the vice-chairman of Singapore Sōgetsu-ryū Association. Both Lee and Aw Cheng Hu were said to be philanthropists. Aw Cheng Hu said to have died in a house of Housing and Development Board in 2010
- Aw Cheng Sin (Chinese: 胡清心), daughter of Aw Boon Par, also known by her Thai name after naturalization, Suri Santipongchai, married to Lee Aik Sim (Lee A. Santipongchai), were the directors of Haw Par Brothers (Thailand) until resigning in 1972; owned and operated the Thai newspaper Sing Sian Yer Pao, published in Chinese, until 2010.

=== Fourth generation ===
- Aw Toke Tone (Fred Aw, Chinese: 胡督東), son of Aw Hoe, managing director of Hongkong Tiger Standard (as early as 1960s to ?), director and minority shareholder of Sing Tao after it became a listed company
- Allan Aw (Chinese: 胡督祿), son of Aw Hoe, auditor (and Office Managing Partner) of Arthur Andersen Hong Kong, member of the Council of The Stock Exchange of Hong Kong from 1999 to ?
- Marcia Aw (Chinese: 胡美三), daughter of Aw Hoe, executive director of Changing Young Lives Foundation (was a branch of Save the Children in Hong Kong)

- Chinese: 胡美一, daughter of Aw Swan, managing director of Sin Poh (Star News) Amalgamated (Malaysia) Sendirian Berhad

- Joyce Aw (Chinese: 胡美二), daughter of Aw Kow (ex-wife of Peter Tham)

- Aw Toke Soon (Chinese: 胡督信), son of Aw Cheng Chye, director of Sin Chew Jit Poh (Singapore) Limited from 1975 to 1978, president of a surfing club in 1970s.
- Aw Toke Ghee (Chinese: 胡督義), son of Aw Cheng Chye, businessman, born August 1952
- Aw Ai Sim, daughter of Aw Cheng Chye, a veterinarian.

- Chinese: 李坤珊, daughter of Lee A. Santipongchai and Suri Santipongchai, managing director of Sing Sian Yer Pao in the 2000s.

- Teng Gee Sigurðsson née Lee daughter of Aw Cheng Hu and Lee Chee Shan. Married to Jón Baldur Sigurðsson. Founded a mime school in Iceland in 1969. She lives with her husband and two children

=== Fifth generation ===
- May Chu Harding née Lee, granddaughter of Lee Chee Shan co-author of autobiography Escape from Paradise.

== Businesses ==
=== Products ===
- Tiger Balm

=== Newspapers ===
Aw Boon Haw, his son Aw Kow, his daughter Sally Aw and his nephew Aw Cheng Taik had founded several newspapers, but none of them are owned by the family at present.

Star Newspapers

- Sing Tao Daily (Hong Kong)
  - Sing Tao Daily (Canada) Toronto and Vancouver
  - Sing Tao Daily (New York City, United States)
  - Sing Tao Wan Pao (Hong Kong, evening newspaper, defunct in 1996)
- Sin Chew Jit Poh (Singapore) (split with its Malaysia edition in 1975, defunct in 1983 by a merger)
  - Sin Chew Daily (Petaling Jaya, Malaysia)
  - Sin Pin Jit Poh (Penang, Malaysia)
- Sin Chung Jit Poh (Chinese: 星中日報, Singapore)
- Sing Sian Yer Pao (Bangkok, Thailand)
  - Sing Thai Wan Pao (evening edition)
- Sing Ming Jih Pao, (Chinese: 星閩日報, Fuzhou, China, defunct circa 1949–50)
- Sing Wah Jih Pao (Chinese: 星華日報, Shantou, China, now defunct)
- Sing Kwong Jih Pao (Chinese: 星光日報, Xiamen, China, now defunct)

English newspapers

- Hongkong Tiger Standard
- Singapore Tiger Standard (defunct in 1959)
- Eastern Sun (Singapore, founded by Aw Kow, defunct in 1971)

Chinese newspaper

- Chinese: 虎報; lit. 'Tiger Newspaper' (Kuala Lumpur, Malaysia, founded by Aw Cheng Taik in 1959, defunct in 1961)
- Express News (Chinese: 快報, Hong Kong, founded by Sally Aw on 1 March 1963, defunct on 16 March 1998)
- Shenxing Times, financial newspaper in collaboration with the Shenzhen Special Zone Daily, published between 1994 and 1999
