= Haw Par =

Haw Par may refer to:

- Aw Boon Haw and Aw Boon Par brothers
  - Building complex related to the brothers
    - Tiger Balm Gardens, known in Chinese language as Haw Par Villa and Haw Par Mansion
  - Haw Par Corporation Limited, Singapore listed company, formerly known as Haw Par Brothers International Limited
  - Haw Par Brothers (Private) Limited, a Singapore private company that was owned by Aw family
