= List of Burmese Chinese =

The following is a list of Chinese Burmese (Burmese of Chinese descent) having a Wikipedia page and are grouped by their area of notability.

== Politicians and Government ==
- San Yu (Hakka) (1918-1996), President of Burma, and Commander in Chief of the Tatmadaw
- Aung Gyi 陈旺枝 (Hokkien) (1919–2012), Brigadier General, Vice-Chief of General Staff of Burmese Army, Minister of Trade and Industry, and Former Chairman of the National League for Democracy Party
- Khin Nyunt (Hakka) (born 1939), Prime Minister and Chief of Intelligence of Myanmar
- Kyaw Myint, Minister of Health and Rector of University of Medicine 1
- Kyi Maung (Teochew) (1920–2004), Colonel, Former Commander of Southwest Military Command of Burmese Army and Former Vice-chairman of the National League for Democracy Party
- Thakin Ohn Myint (1918–2010), Journalist and Anti-colonialist
- Pheung Kya-shin 彭家声 (Yunnanese) (born 1931), Leader of Kokang Special Region and Commander-in-Chief of Myanmar National Democratic Alliance Army
- Bao Youxiang 鲍有祥 (Wa ethnicity) (born 1949), Leader of Wa State and Commander-in-Chief of the United Wa State Army
- Tan Yu Sai 陈裕才, Colonel, Former Vice-Commissioner of General of People's Police, and Minister of Trade of Myanmar
- Olive Yang, opium warlord and sister of the saopha (chief) of Kokang

== Businesspeople ==
- Aik Htun 李松枝 (born 1948), Businessman and Banker
- Aw Boon Haw 胡文虎 (1882–1954) (Hakka), Burmese Chinese Entrepreneur and Philanthropist best known for introducing Tiger Balm
- Aw Boon Par 胡文豹 (1888–1944) (Hakka), Burmese Chinese Entrepreneur and Philanthropist
- Aw Chu Kin 胡子钦 (?–1908) (Hakka), Burmese Chinese Herbalist and Inventor of Tiger Balm
- Chan Mah Phee 曾广庇 (Hokkien), Businessman, Investor and Philanthropist
- Htun Myint Naing 罗平忠 (born 1958) (Kokang), Business Tycoon
- Kyaw Win, Chairman of Sky Net and Shwe Than Lwin Company
- Lim Chin Tsong 林振宗 (1867–1923) (Hokkien), First Overseas Chinese Tycoon in Myanmar
- Peter Chou Win Than 周永明 (Yunnanese) (born 1956), Former CEO, President and Co-founder of HTC
- Serge Pun Theim Wai 潘继泽 (born 1953), Businessman and Chairman of the Serge Pun & Associates Group (SPA Group)
- Zhang Xin 张欣 (born 1965), Chinese billionaire, co-founder and CEO of SOHO China

== Other personalities ==
- Bruce Le 黄建龙 (born 1950), Martial Artist, Actor and Director
- Chen Yi-sein Yi Sein 陈孺性 (1924–2005), Historian and one of the first members of the Burma Historical Commission
- Edward Michael Law-Yone (1911–1980), Burmese Journalist and Founder of The Nation, Burma's most influential English language newspaper during the time
- Khin Yu May (1937– 2014), a two-time Myanmar Academy Award winning actress and singer
- Khun Sa 张奇夫 (1934–2007)(Kokang), Famous Drug Lord, and Commander-in-Chief of the Mong Tai Army and the Shan United Revolutionary Army
- Lo Hsing Han 罗星汉 (1935–2013) (Kokang), Drug Lord and Business Tycoon
- Loletta Chu 朱玲玲 (born 1958) (Cantonese), 1977 Miss Hong Kong Pageant
- Maung Htin Htin Fatt (1909–2006), Writer and Journalist
- Minfong Ho (born 1951), Chinese-American Writer
- Moe Set Wine (Chinese: 杨鑫荣) (born 1988) (Yunnanese), Miss Universe Myanmar 2013
- Alice Ong (born 1994), actress
- Ngwe Gaing, Alinga Kyawzwa Award-Winning painter
- Sayadaw U Tejaniya (born 1962), Theravadin Buddhist monk and meditation teacher at Shwe Oo Min Dhamma Sukha Forest Center
- Taw Sein Ko 杜成诰 (1864–1930) (Hokkien), First Recorded Archaeologist in Myanmar and Assistant Secretary to the Government of British Burma
- Thaw Kaung (born 1937) (Hokkien), Historian
