= Aw Cheng Chye =

Singaporean millionaire

Yang Berhormat Dato' Aw Cheng Chye SPMJ BBM OStJ
- 胡清才
- Born: 1 January 1924; Rangoon, British Burma
- Died: 22 August 1971 (aged 48); Santiago, Chile
- Occupations: Businessman; company director; philanthropist
- Board member of: Singapore Chinese FA; Singapore Red Cross; Singapore Olympic Council; Haw Par Brothers (Pte.); Haw Par Brothers Int'l; Sin Poh Amalgamated; Chung Khiaw Bank
- Spouse: Tay Chwee Sian (1949–1971)
Parent
Aw Boon Par	(father)
Daw Saw	(biological mother)
Tay Piah Lan	(mother) (Note: At the time Chinese culture allowed multiple wives, Tay Piah Lan was the first and Daw Saw was the second)
Teo Hong Yin	(mother)
- Relatives: Aw Chu Kin (grandfather); Aw Boon Haw (uncle)

Aw Cheng Chye (1 January 1924 – 22 August 1971) was a Singaporean millionaire, businessman, company director, philanthropist and son of businessman Aw Boon Par. Aw Cheng Chye himself was the chairman of Haw Par Brothers (Private) Limited and Haw Par Brothers International Limited until his sudden death on 22 August 1971 in Santiago de Chile.

== Biography ==
=== Early life ===
Aw Cheng Chye was born in Rangoon, British Burma of Hakka Chinese descent. At young age, Aw Cheng Chye inherited part of the wealth of his father, who died in 1944.

=== Business career ===
Aw Cheng Chye became a deputy to his uncle Aw Boon Haw to manage family business in Singapore in the 1950s, which saw Aw Cheng Chye was a director of an insurance company Public Insurance (Chinese: 大衆保險) in 1951, while Aw Boon Haw was the chairman. Aw Cheng Chye remained as a shareholder and a director at least until circa 1960s. He also served as a director of the sister company Public Life Assurance (Chinese: 大眾人壽保險). When the incorporation of Sin Poh Amalgamated (Hong Kong) in 1951, he also received 60 shares out of 1500, and Aw Cheng Chye's son Aw Toke Soon, 30 shares. His brother Aw Cheng Taik was a director, along with Aw Boon Haw and his sons and daughter Aw Swan, Sally Aw and Aw It Haw, who resides in Hong Kong at that time.

After the death of Aw Boon Haw in 1954, Aw Cheng Chye became the chairman of Haw Par Brothers (Private) which owned the majority of family assets and business, (except Hong Kong newspapers). The shareholder of the holding company including his relatives, such as Sally Aw who inherited the Hong Kong newspapers and based in Hong Kong. According to Aw Boon Haw's will, Sally Aw was responsible for the sale of the assets under Boon Haw name, and requested (but not legally binding) her to use part or whole in charity. The lawsuit of the heritage of Aw Boon Haw was settled in 1967, which Haw Par Brothers (Private) reclaimed assets based in Hong Kong which were mistaken to be the private heritage of Boon Haw. Sally Aw paid the company S$1.7 million as compensation.

Aw Cheng Chye was also the mastermind of the offer to sell the Haw Par Mansion and its gardens of Hong Kong in 1961. The mansion was owned by the holding company, but lived by Sally Aw until 1998.

Aw Cheng Chye took most of the assets of Haw Par Brothers (Private) public by incorporating a new holding company Haw Par Brothers International Limited in July 1969, but not including the Haw Par Mansions, only leasing them to the company; not all the stake of Chung Khiaw Bank was injected to the listed company either. He also privatized Sin Poh (Star News) Amalgamated, a subsidiary of Haw Par Brothers International in June 1971. Both companies were chaired by Aw Cheng Chye. In the same month Slater Walker acquired the controlling stake of the listed company. In the same month, 49.8% stake of Chung Khiaw Bank was sold by Haw Par Brothers International to United Overseas Bank, just few days after the staff of the bank opposed the takeover of a foreign firm. The president of the bank Lee Chee Shan, sister-in-law of Aw Cheng Chye, retired in July 1971.

Shortly after the takeover of Haw Par Brothers International, Cheng Chye was found dead during a vacation trip in Santiago de Chile on 22 August 1971. Lee Kuan Yew, Prime Minister of Singapore also wrote a public pleading to Aw family.

Upon his death, he chaired Haw Par Brothers International and as a director of Chung Khiaw Bank. He also served as a director of many companies and in public organizations such as Singapore Chinese Chamber of Commerce.

He was a director of Robinson & Co. in 1963, and chairman of Rothmans Singapore in 1966 and Life Record Industries in 1969. Under the chairmanship of Aw Cheng Chye, Rothmans donated S$100,000 to the Singapore Sports Council (Chinese: 新加坡全國體育協會).

=== Public organization ===
Aw Cheng Chye served in Singapore Anti-Tuberculosis Association (Chinese: 新加坡防癆協會), the predecessor of SATA CommHealth in 1967 as well as the vice-president of the Singapore Red Cross Society, only deputy to the wife of the prime minister, Kwa Geok Choo. He made numerous donation to the hospitals, the red cross and St John Singapore. He also donated S$1,000 to a blood donor society in 1960.

He was nominated for an (honorary) position in St John Singapore in 1963. He was one of the honorary chairmen in 1962. He was a member of the council of St John Singapore in 1960, and previously vice-chairman. He was elected as an honorary chairman of Thong Chai Medical Institution in the 1960s.

Aw Cheng Chye was also an active leader of the overseas Chinese. He was the vice-chairman of Singapore Nanyang Khek Community Guild (Note: simplified Chinese: 南洋客属总会; traditional Chinese: 南洋客屬總會 abb. 南洋客總, also translated as Nanyang Hwu Clan General Association, but The Nanyang Khek Community Guild was the official name.) in the 1960s. He donated S$40,000 for the new building of the guild in 1969. He also donated S$1,000 to "Persatuan Hakka Segamat" of nearby Johor state in 1967. As a director of Singapore Chinese Chamber of Commerce, he was a member of the organizing committee of 1959 Singapore Constitution Exposition. He donated S$1,500 to the chamber for a project to dig the remains of the citizens who was killed during Japanese occupation of Singapore in 1966. In 1958, he donated $S6,000 (under the name of Eng Aun Tong) to a repairing work of a Chinese cemetery.

In the 1960s, he also served as the president of Singapore Scout Association. He was elected as the honorary chairman of Singapore Tourist Association (Chinese: 新加坡旅遊協會) in 1964 and as honorary member in 1969.

In education, He was nominated by the government to the council of Nanyang University in 1970 until his death. He was the vice-chairman of the raising fund committee of Institute of Southeast Asian Studies in 1970. He also donated S$25,000 to build a school in September 1970 as well as S$1,000 for a charity basketball tournament for the establishment of Nanyang University in 1953 and a Chinese school $200, in 1965.

In arts, he was a member of the trustee of Kreta Ayer People's Theatre in 1970. He was an honorary president of the Photographic Society of Singapore, and sponsored one of the award of 1698 Singapore International Photography Award.

He also sponsored Singapore Buddhist Federation for S$2,000, Singapore Chinese Chamber of Commerce for $60,000 for the construction cost of its new building, as well as honorary chairman in the organizing committee of Christmas Charity 1966. As a director of Haw Par Brothers (Pte.), he allowed a village to build a temple on a land that was owned by the company in 1947. He donated S$3,000 to the victims of a fire accident in 1967, S$2,000 for Singapore Association for the Blind in 1964.

To sum up, he followed the footstep of his uncle Aw Boon Haw as a philanthropist, but also involved in the day-to-day operation of the organizations.

=== Sports ===
Aw Cheng Chye was the president of the Singapore Chinese Football Club (Note: Chinese: 新加坡华人足球会, also known as The Singapore Chinese Football Association, which was a sub-association of Singapore Amateur Football Association and Malaysian Chinese Football Association (M.C.F.A.).) from 1954 to 1955. He also served as the vice-chairman of Chinese: 馬華體育促進會; lit. 'Malaysian Chinese Sports Association' in 1957 and vice-president of Singapore Chinese Swimming Club (Chinese: 新加坡中華游泳會) in 1962. He sponsored S$2,000 to Singapore Chinese Swimming Club in January 1964 as well as elected as an honorary president in May 1964. In the 1960s, he was an honorary president of Basketball Association of Singapore.

Aw Cheng Chye was elected as the vice-president of Singapore National Olympic Council in 1954. He was the delegate for the Singapore Amateur Boxing Association of Singapore, which he was the president.

Upon his death, Aw Cheng Chye was an honorary chairman of Malaysian Chinese Football Association.

Aw Cheng Chye was one of the many honorary chairmen of Singapore Chin Woo Athletic Association (Chinese: 新加坡精武體育會) in the 1950s and 1960s, as well as Singapore Pak Hock Pai Athletic Association (Chinese: 新加坡白鶴派體育會) and Chinese: 崇正國術體育會. These associations were related to Chinese martial arts.

His uncle was once famous for his charity, as well as infamously credited as "shameless promoter" [of his product and himself] by Asiaweek. However, Aw Cheng Chye also known for numerous sponsorship in sports. For example, a golf tournament was named after him in 1967, as well as "Aw Cheng Chye Shield" of Merdeka Weightlifting Tournament, a Nanyang University Sepak takraw Tournament, a boxing tournament, a wrestling tournament and a chess tournament. A football tournament that was named after "Tiger Balm", was also sponsored by Aw Cheng Chye in 1958. The football cup was also known as Aw Cheng Chye Cup in 1960.

Aw Cheng Chye was one of the sponsor of Cuesports Singapore (Chinese: 新加坡檯球協會, later 新加坡台球總會) for many years as well as Singapore Table Tennis Association and a predecessor of Singapore Weightlifting Federation (Chinese: 新加坡業餘舉重與健身總會); he was an honorary chairman in 1963.

He also sponsored S$3,000 to The Festival of Sport fund, S$3,000 to Singapore team for 1965 Southeast Asian Peninsular Games, S$500 for 1969 Southeast Asian Peninsular Games, a car for a fund raising event for 1970 British Commonwealth Games and 1970 Asian Games, as well as S$1,000 to a minor swimming club, and S$500 to Singapore women's national football team.

== Legacy ==
Sin Chew Jit Poh Building in Singapore was known as Aw Cheng Chye Building. It was a property of Haw Par Brothers (Private) in the 1970s. A scholarship was set up in the University of Singapore in 1972 by Haw Par Brothers International for S$20,000 each year (initially up to 7 years).

Aw Kow (Chinese: 胡蛟), the eldest (adopted) son of the late Aw Boon Haw, sued Haw Par Brothers (Private) Limited in 1972 for blocking him to read its accounts and financial statements, claiming under the late Aw Cheng Chye, the company allowed personal spending of Aw Cheng Chye, was invoiced by the company itself. The lawsuit was settled in 1977 in favoured Aw Kow.

In the autobiography Escape from Paradise by John & May Chu Harding, they also claimed that Aw Cheng Chye's decision to make Haw Par Brothers International public, was against the wish of the part of the Aw family. May Chu Harding, née Lee, was the great-granddaughter of Aw Boon Par, or granddaughter of Lee Chee Shan and Aw Cheng Hu. Lee Chee Shan (Chinese: 李志成) was the president of Chung Khiaw Bank, but retired in July 1971.

The business empire of Haw Par Brothers International and Aw family was completely dismantled after the takeover and the death of Aw Cheng Chye in 1971. After the brother-in-law and sister of Aw Cheng Chye resigned as the directors of Thai subsidiary of Haw Par Brothers International, the Thai subsidiary, which was responsible to make "Tiger Balm" liniment in Thailand, was sold in 1972. A proposal to acquire the remaining shares of Chung Khiaw Bank by United Overseas Bank, was announced in the same year. At that time due to the ability of director from the related parties being able to vote in such deal, a minority shareholder made a public statement on the newspaper, requesting the government to investigate.

== Awards ==
- Honorary degree of Doctor of Laws, Fairleigh Dickinson University

== Honorary titles ==
- Officer (O.St.J) of the Order of Saint John (St John Singapore) (1959 until his death)
- Dato Paduka Mahkota Johore (D.P.M.J.) of the Order of the Crown of Johor (1963–1968)
- Dato Sri Paduka Mahkota Johore (S.P.M.J.) of the Order of the Crown of Johor (1968 until his death)
- Bintang Bakti Masyarakat (BBM)

== Personal life ==
Aw Cheng Chye married to Tay Chwee Sian (Chinese: 鄭水仙) also known as Datin Aw Cheng Chye. Aw Toke Soon (Chinese: 胡督信), Toke Ghee (Chinese: 胡督义) and Toke Ho are their son, as well daughter Aw Ai Sim.

After Sin Poh (Star News) Amalgamated selling the publishing rights of Sin Chew Jit Poh (Singapore) in 1975 to the company of the same name, Tay Chwee Sian and Aw Toke Soon retained management shares of the company until 1978. They gave up the management shares (converted to ordinary shares) as well as the chance to be elected as the directors of Sin Chew Jit Poh (Singapore) Limited in 1978.

His daughter, Aw Ai Sim, is a veterinarian.

Aw Cheng Chye's mother, Daw Saw, widow of Aw Boon Par, died in 1983.

Like his late father, Aw Cheng Chye was a Buddhist and a Buddhist funeral was conducted for him. He was also one of the honorary director of Singapore Buddhist Lodge in the 1960s.
