= Singapore Tiger Standard =

Singaporean daily newspaper

Singapore Standard
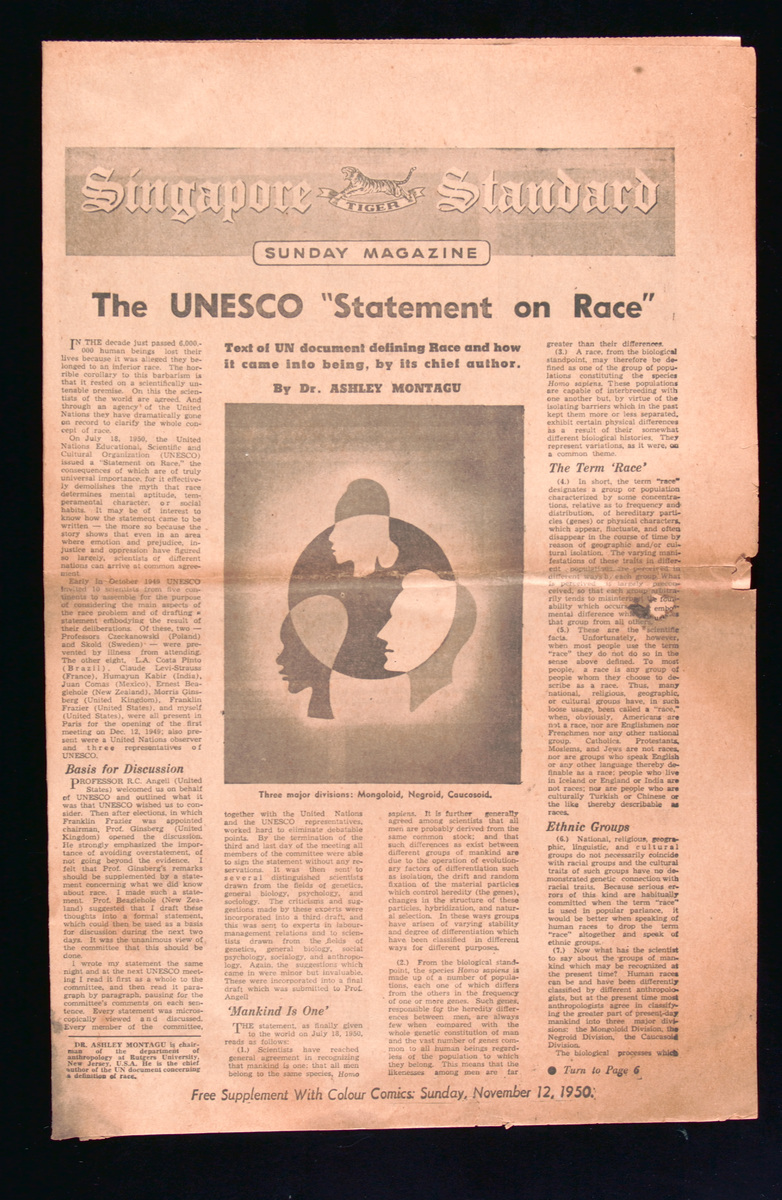
- Sunday magazine, 12 November 1950
- Type: Daily newspaper
- Owner: Sin Poh Amalgamated
- Founder: Aw Boon Haw
- Publisher: Sin Poh Amalgamated
- President: Aw Cheng Taik
- Founded: 3 July 1950
- Ceased publication: 31 July 1959
- Country: Singapore
- Sister newspapers: Hongkong Standard; Sin Chew Jit Poh; other newspapers that were founded by Aw Boon Haw
- OCLC number: 19257286

Singapore Tiger Standard
- Traditional Chinese: 星洲虎報
- Literal meaning: Singapore Tiger News
Transcriptions

The Singapore Standard, more commonly known as Singapore Tiger Standard or Tiger Standard, was a Singaporean newspaper published in English. The newspaper was founded by millionaire Aw Boon Haw, famous for his Tiger Balm and Star Newspapers. Singapore Standard was the sister newspaper of the English-language Hongkong Tiger Standard, as well as Sin Chew Jit Po of Singapore and Malaysia, published in Chinese. In 1959, shortly after the Colony of Singapore gained self-governance, publisher Sin Poh Amalgamated ended publication of Singapore Standard. It was reported that Aw Cheng Taik, a relative of Aw Boon Haw (who had died in 1954) and former managing director of Singapore Standard, founded another "Tiger Newspaper" (Chinese: 中文虎報; lit. 'Chinese Tiger Newspaper', also known as Chinese: 吉隆坡虎報; lit. 'Kuala Lumpur Tiger Newspaper') in August 1959 in Kuala Lumpur in the Federation of Malaya, which published in Chinese language. "Kuala Lumpur Tiger" ceased publication in 1961 due to financial difficulties. Singapore Standard, the Federation of Malaya edition was also published by the same press for nearby Federation of Malaya.

== History ==
Singapore Standard was founded by millionaire Aw Boon Haw in 1950. Despite being born in Burma, he was ethnic Hakka Chinese. According to Joe Conceicao, a former member of parliament of Singapore, the newspaper reflected the Chinese entrepreneurial interests. The newspaper was founded shortly before the January 1951 closure of Malaya Tribune, an English-language newspaper. Shortly after its foundation, Aw Boon Haw's son Aw Hoe (Chinese: 胡好), who helped to found The Standard newspapers as well as Sing Tao Daily, died during a plane crash in January 1951. Other sons and relatives of Aw Boon Haw then filled the positions (such as managing director, Chinese: 社長) to manage Singapore Standard. Aw Boon Haw died in 1954, after which Hong Kong Tiger Standard fell under the control of his daughter Sally Aw and his grandson Aw Toke Tone (Chinese: 胡督東, son of Aw Hoe). Sally Aw had a bitter relationship with her Singapore-based family members regarding the heritage of Aw Boon Haw in Hong Kong. The last managing director of Singapore Standard was Aw Cheng Taik (Chinese: 胡清德), nephew of Aw Boon Haw and son of the late Aw Boon Par. Regardless of these issues, Singapore Standard became one of the most widely circulated English newspapers in the colony of Singapore, for which Singapore Standard was credited as "№2", by its competitor The Straits Times in April 1959.

In the eve of the 1959 Singaporean general election, former Singapore Standard and The Straits Times editor S. Rajaratnam, then a politician of People's Action Party (PAP), attacked Singapore Standard as ‘less intelligent’ and ‘anti-Merdeka’ [anti-independence] in April 1959. The PAP again attacked The Straits Times in April and mentioned Singapore Standard.

Despite the State of Singapore Act being passed by the Parliament of the United Kingdom in 1958, the de facto self-governance of Singapore was achieved after the May 1959 election, when the PAP became the ruling party, a position it holds to this day. On 31 July 1959, shortly after the PAP gained power, the Aw family decided to close down the newspaper, without announcing a reason for doing so. The Singapore Union of Journalists (Note: A predecessor of Singapore National Union of Journalists) expressed ‘deep concern’ on the closure, saying nearly all the staff did not know of the closure until the day of the Singapore Standard press release on 31 July. The staff of the newspaper submitted claims for an increased severance package, but the management board claimed that due to financial difficulties they were unable to increase their offer. The Singapore Trades Union Congress (now NTUC) did not believe the company faced financial difficulties, and requested liquidation to pay staff.

== Masthead and name ==
The masthead of the newspaper featured the name Singapore Standard, as well as the Tiger trademark of Aw Boon Haw's Eng Aun Tong in between the two words, making the common name of the newspaper Singapore Tiger Standard. In some versions, the Chinese name 星洲虎報, literally "Singapore Tiger News", was also shown. The sister newspaper in Hong Kong was called 英文虎報 as its Chinese proper name, literally "English Tiger News", despite its official name in English being just The Standard.

== Notable staffs ==
- Lee Khoon Choy
- S. Rajaratnam

== OCLC numbers ==
- OCLC 19257286
- OCLC 28568118 (microfilm)
- OCLC 214286663 (microfilm)
- OCLC 422711408 (microfilm)
- OCLC 499376261 (microfilm)
