= Chung Khiaw Bank =

Former Singaporean bank

- Type: Subsidiary (Former private)
- Industry: Financial services
Founded
4 February 1950	(start operation)
Founder
Aw Boon Haw	(as shareholder and founding chairman)
Lee Chee Shan	(as founding managing director)
Defunct
1999	(in Singapore market)
1997	(in Malaysia market)
1999	(in Hong Kong market)
- Fate: Merged with UOB
- Successor: Certain UOB branches in Singapore, Malaysia and Hong Kong
- Headquarters: International Plaza, Singapore
- Area served: Singapore; Malaysia; Hong Kong
- Services: retail banking; corporate banking
Net income
▼ S$66 million	(1997)
▼ S$53 million	(1998)
- Owner: United Overseas Bank (100%)
- Parent: United Overseas Bank

Chinese name
- Traditional Chinese: 崇僑銀行
- Simplified Chinese: 崇侨银行
- Literal meaning: Honor Overseas Bank (Bank [that] Honor Overseas [Chinese])
Transcriptions
Standard Mandarin
- Hanyu Pinyin: Chóngqiáo yínháng
Yue: Cantonese
- Jyutping: sung^{4} kiu^{4} ngan^{4} hang^{4}
- Footnotes; Profit excluding Malaysia branches

Chung Khiaw Bank Limited was a Singaporean bank that was established by millionaire Aw Boon Haw and later became a subsidiary of United Overseas Bank after takeovers in 1971–72. Part of the shares of Chung Khiaw Bank was injected to a listed company Haw Par Brothers International in 1969 and was acquired by a domestic competitor United Overseas Bank (UOB) in 1971, after the parent company was takeover by Slater Walker. Chung Khiaw Bank merged with UOB in 1999.

The brand "Chung Khiaw Bank" survived in nearby Malaysia as a subsidiary of UOB until 1997. In 1997, UOB (Malaysia) merged with Chung Khiaw Bank (Malaysia).

In 1971, Chung Khiaw Bank also have two branches in Hong Kong, which became the branches of UOB in 1999.

== History ==
Chung Khiaw Bank was established as a family-held business on 59 Robinson Road, Singapore. The founding chairman of the bank was millionaire Aw Boon Haw, who famous for his "Star Newspapers", and "Tiger Balm"; after his death, Ko Teck Kin (Chinese: 高德根) and then Aw Cheng Chye, nephew of Aw Boon Haw and son of Aw Boon Par succeed the position. However, the founding managing director / president of the bank, was Lee Chee Shan (李志城), (Note: Both 成 and 城 were used in the news report, but actually the two Chinese characters have different meaning. Chinese: 李志成 seem incorrect, as 城 was used in the death notice) husband of Aw Cheng Hu, the daughter of Aw Boon Par. It was reported that Lee himself was a blood relatives of Aw Boon Haw and Boon Par, according to Lee granddaughter's autobiography (distant relatives) and a book by the Institute of Southeast Asian Studies (first cousin once removed). Lee still served for the bank after the death of Aw Boon Haw.

In 1969, Aw Cheng Chye took most of the assets of family-held holding company Haw Par Brothers (Private) Limited public by the incorporation of Haw Par Brothers International and an initial public offering. The assets including equity stake of Chung Khiaw Bank. In June 1971, the listed company was takeover by Slater Walker. However, the 49.8% stake of Chung Khiaw Bank that was held by the listed company, was sold to domestic competitor United Overseas Bank (UOB) for S$22 million. Lee Chee Shan was retired from the position "lifetime president" in July 1971 with a retirement compensation of S$750,000. Before his retirement, his monthly salary was S$35,500. Lee Chee Shan was appointed as "lifetime president" from managing director circa 1 June 1971.

In 1972, a new logo for both UOB and Chung Khiaw Bank was launched. Some member of Aw family, such as Aw It Haw, remained as the director of Chung Khiaw Bank in January 1972, with the rest was related to UOB. Aw Cheng Chye also remained as the director until his death on 22 August 1971. A proposal to acquire the remaining stake of Chung Khiaw Bank by UOB by a share swap (1:1), was announced in June 1972. A minority shareholder made a public statement on the newspaper to against it, claiming the price was not favourable as well as the conflict of interest of the director from the related parties. Nevertheless, UOB acquired an additional 28.7% stake in mid-1973.

In 1974, a rumor that the bank's financial position was precarious caused a bank run in its Singapore branches. This was one of the reasons why deposit insurance was introduced in Singapore.

Chung Khiaw Bank finally became a wholly owned subsidiary of UOB in February 1988 by issuing 15,230,903 number of UOB new shares as payment for the remaining 17.13 million number of shares (17.1%) of Chung Khiaw Bank. At the time of acquisition, Aw It Haw was still a director of Chung Khiaw Bank.

In 1997, Malaysia branches was merged with UOB branches. In 1999, Chung Khiaw Bank was finally absorbed by UOB, became UOB branches.
