= Sin Poh (Star News) Amalgamated =

- Formerly: Sin Poh (Star News) Amalgamated (Private) Limited
- Company type: Private company
- Industry: Newspaper publishing
- Founded: 1941
- Founder: Aw Boon Haw
- Defunct: 1980s
- Fate: Dissolved – members' voluntary winding up; main business sold in 1975 to 1982
- Successor: Sin Poh (Star News) Amalgamated (Malaysia); Sin Chew Jit Poh (Singapore) Limited
- Headquarters: Singapore
- Area served: Singapore; Malaysia
- Products: Sin Chew Jit Poh; Sin Pin Jit Poh; Singapore Standard
- Owner: Aw family
- Subsidiaries: Sin Poh (Star News) Amalgamated (Malaysia)

Chinese name
- Traditional Chinese: 星系報業有限公司
Transcriptions
Standard Mandarin
- Hanyu Pinyin: Xīngxì bàoyè yǒuxiàn gōngsī
Yue: Cantonese
- Jyutping: sing^{1} hai^{6} bou^{3} jip^{6} jau^{5} haan^{6} gung^{1} si^{1}

Sin Poh (Star News) Amalgamated Limited was a Singapore-based publishing company that published Sin Chew Jit Poh (Chinese: 星洲日報) in both Singapore and Malaysia, as well as Sin Pin Jit Poh (Chinese: 星檳日報) in Penang, Malaysia.

The Malaysian editions were sold to a Malaysian businessman in 1982. In 1975, due to new legislation in Singapore, the assets and publishing rights of the Singapore edition of Sin Chew Jit Poh were sold to Sin Chew Jit Poh (Singapore) Limited. However, the Aw family, descendants of the founder, retained some management shares.

In 1977, Sin Chew Jit Poh (Singapore) Limited launched an initial public offering to sell ordinary shares of the company. It later merged to form Singapore News and Publications Limited in 1982, a predecessor of Singapore Press Holdings.

== History ==
The newspapers Sin Chew Jit Poh and Sin Pin Jit Poh were founded by Chinese billionaire Aw Boon Haw in January 1929 and 1939, respectively, in Singapore and Penang, then part of the Straits Settlements. The publisher of Sin Chew Jit Poh was incorporated in 1928, while its parent company, Sin Poh (Star News) Amalgamated Limited, was incorporated in 1941.

After the death of Aw Boon Haw in 1954, the Singapore and Malaysian editions were separated from the Hong Kong editions of Star Newspapers (Note: Sing Tao Daily (Chinese: 星島日報) and Sing Tao Wan Pao (Chinese: 星島晚報; lit. 'Sing Tao Evening News') respectively) and Tiger Standard. The Hong Kong editions were primarily owned by Aw Boon Haw’s daughter, Sally Aw (Note: via Sin Poh Amalgamated (Hong Kong) Limited and The Tiger Standard Limited), and his grandson, Aw Toke Tone (Chinese: 胡督東). (Note: via The Tiger Standard Limited) The Thai edition of Star Newspapers (Note: Sing Sian Yer Pao and its evening edition Sing Thai Wan Pao) was also owned by the Aw family but was not part of the Singapore-incorporated Sin Poh (Star News) Amalgamated Limited. (Note: As of July 1971, it was owned by Haw Par Brothers International, the public company owned by Aw family. The chairman of Sing Sian Yer Pao from 1971 to 2005 was Lee Aik Sim (Lee Santipongchai, Chinese: 李益森), husband of Aw Cheng Sin (Chinese: 胡清心), the daughter of late Aw Boon Par; unknown date of disposal of the newspaper by Haw Par Brothers International, after June 1971 takeover by Slater Walker, probably sold before 1976.)

In 1966, Sin Poh (Star News) Amalgamated Limited purchased land in Petaling Jaya, Malaysia, to establish its Malaysian bureau. From then on, the Malaysian edition developed its own content, gradually distinguishing itself from its Singapore counterpart.

=== Went public ===
In December 1969, the Singapore-based descendants of the late Aw Boon Haw and his brother, Aw Boon Par, publicly listed most of the assets of Haw Par Brothers (Private) Limited, forming Haw Par Brothers International. These assets included Sin Poh (Star News) Amalgamated Limited.

=== Privatization ===
However, in June 1971, the company was taken over by Slater Walker, reducing the Aw family to minority shareholders. At the same time, Aw Cheng Chye (Chinese: 胡清才), the eldest son of the late Aw Boon Par, acquired Sin Poh (Star News) Amalgamated Limited from Haw Par Brothers International. He was also serving as the company's chairman at the time. However, later that year, Aw Cheng Chye passed away in Santiago, Chile.

In May 1971, Aw Kow (Chinese: 胡蛟), the eldest son of the late Aw Boon Haw, resigned as a director of Sin Poh (Star News) Amalgamated Limited and as the managing director (Chinese: 社長) of Sin Chew Jit Poh. That same year, a scandal emerged when the Singapore government revealed that Eastern Sun (Chinese: 英文東方日報), an English-language newspaper founded by Aw Kow in 1966, had received financial support from a Chinese intelligence service based in Hong Kong. In response, Sin Poh (Star News) Amalgamated issued a press release in May 1971, stating that it had no connection with Eastern Sun.

Although Star News itself was not affected, that year saw the closure of Eastern Sun, the arrest of the chairman of Nanyang Siang Pau Press, and other significant events concerning the press. Ironically, despite being accused of having ties to the People's Republic of China and posing a threat to Singapore's internal security, Aw Kow was never charged or imprisoned.

After Aw Kow’s departure, Frank Wong (simplified Chinese: 黄溢华; traditional Chinese: 黃溢華) was promoted to general manager (Chinese: 總經理) of Sin Chew Jit Poh (Singapore) in December 1972. The position was previously held by Aw Swan (Chinese: 胡山), the second son of the late Aw Boon Haw, from 25 June 1971 to around 1972.

Nevertheless, the Government of Singapore initiated another media reform in 1975 that affected Star News.

=== Dismantle ===
Following the enactment of the Newspaper and Printing Presses Act in 1974, the Singapore edition of Sin Chew Jit Poh came under the ownership of a newly incorporated company, Sin Chew Jit Poh (Singapore) Limited. From 1975 until its initial public offering in 1977, the majority ownership—through both ordinary and management shares—was held by the Aw family (including the widow of Aw Cheng Chye and her son, Aw Toke Soon (Chinese: 胡督信), as well as Aw It Haw (Chinese: 胡一虎), the fourth son of the late Aw Boon Haw), senior editors of Sin Chew Jit Poh (such as Frank Wong, Goh Seah Hiong (Note: Chinese: 吴声雄, also known as Wu Shik (Chinese: 吴锡)) and Lu Kuang Chi (Chinese: 卢光池)) and Singapore’s sovereign wealth fund, Temasek.

Management shares functioned as a form of golden share, granting holders decisive voting power on resolutions related to the appointment or dismissal of directors or staff, while otherwise carrying the same voting rights as ordinary shares. This structure rendered ordinary shares inferior in certain circumstances. Without a majority stake in management shares, ordinary shares, or board representation, the Aw family effectively lost its ability to use the newspaper as a tool for public influence.

By August 1978, only one member of the Aw family, Aw It Haw, remained on the board of directors. In October 1978, the management shares held by the widow of Aw Cheng Chye and her son, Aw Toke Soon, as well as those held by Goh Seah Hiong, Lu Kuang Chi (both of whom resigned as directors in August), and Lim Pang Kwang, were converted into ordinary shares. The issuance of new management shares in June 1979 further diluted Aw It Haw’s voting rights in terms of management shareholding.

In 1983, the Singapore edition of Sin Chew Jit Poh was merged with its competitor, the Singapore edition of Nanyang Siang Pau to form Lianhe Zaobao and Lianhe Wanbao. The merger was announced by the Singapore government and the respective companies in April 1982. That same year, their parent companies were merged to form Singapore News and Publications Limited. In 1984, Singapore News and Publications Limited merged again with the publisher of The Straits Times, creating the media monopoly Singapore Press Holdings, later rebranded as SPH Media.

Nevertheless, the Malaysian editions were also sold in 1982 to Malaysian businessman Lim Kheng Kim (Chinese: 林庆金). The publisher of these editions, formerly known as Sin Poh (Star News) Amalgamated (Malaysia) Sendirian Berhad, later became part of Media Chinese International Limited (MCIL) in 2008.
