= Tiger Standard =

Tiger Standard may refer to:

- Singapore Tiger Standard, Singapore newspaper published in English language
- Hongkong Tiger Standard, Hong Kong newspaper published in English language
