= Sin Poh Amalgamated Limited =

Sin Poh Amalgamated Limited may refer to:

- Sin Poh Amalgamated (Hong Kong) Limited Hong Kong newspaper publisher
- Sin Poh (Star News) Amalgamated Limited Singapore-incorporated newspaper publisher in Singapore and Malaysia.
- Sin Poh (Star News) Amalgamated (Malaysia) Sendirian Berhad, see Sin Chew Daily
