= Eng Aun Tong Building =

Building in Singapore

Coordinates: 1°16′43″N 103°50′30″E

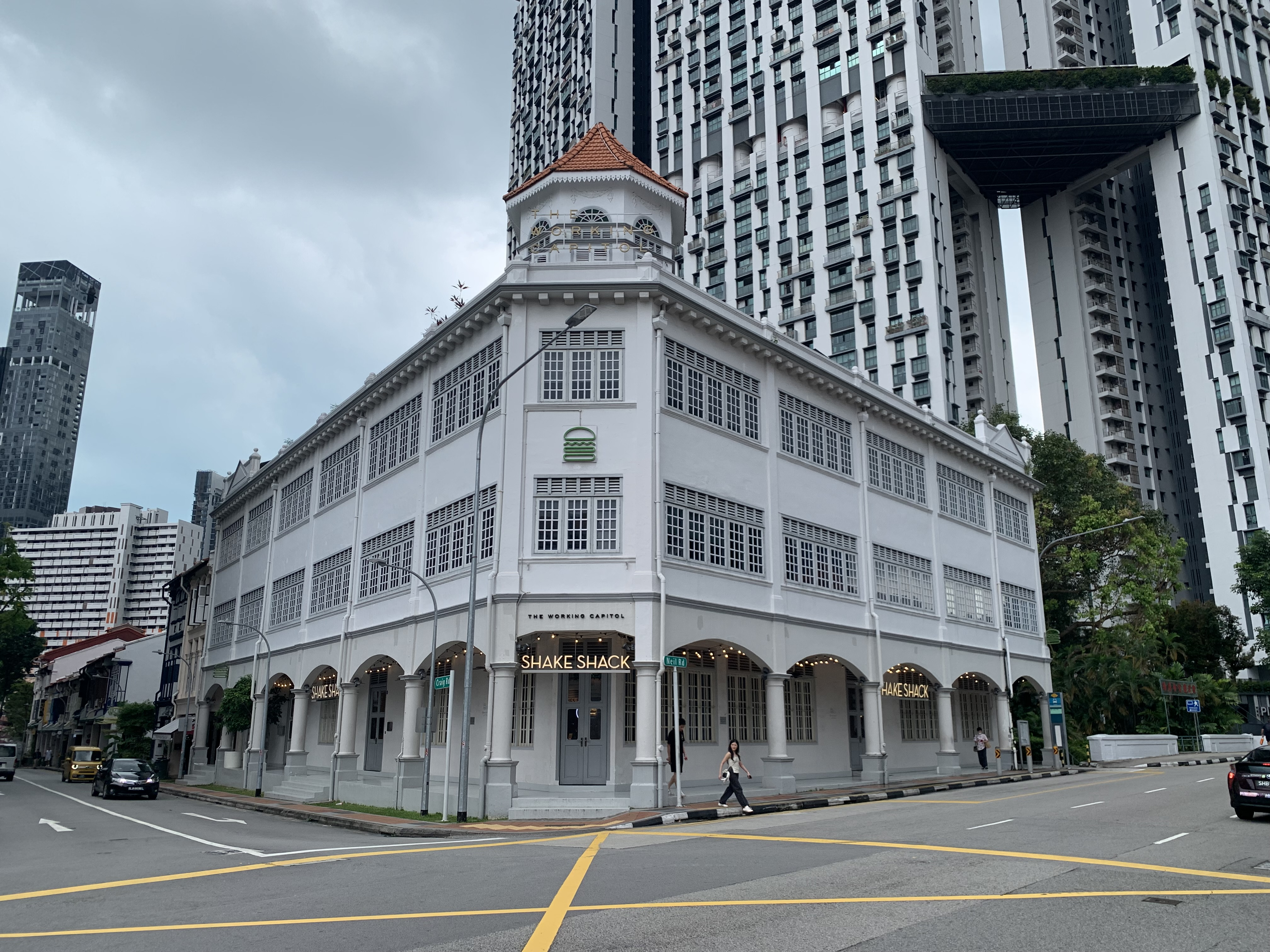
The building in 2025

Eng Aun Tong Building, also known as Tiger Balm Medical Hall, is a historic building at the corner of Neil Road and Craig Road in Tanjong Pagar, Singapore. Completed in the 1920s, it served as the Tiger Balm factory for several decades.

== Description ==
The building was designed in the Neoclassical style, featuring cornices, arches, columns and a hexagonal pavilion on the roof, which may be a reference to the Tiger Balm bottle. It previously featured a model of a tiger on its front. The building is among the few pre-World War II structures in Singapore to feature a flat roof.

== History ==
The building was opened as the Tiger Balm factory in 1926 by brothers Aw Boon Haw and Aw Boon Par. Aw Boon Haw soon filed a lawsuit against a medical hall of the same name which had been established earlier at nearby 132-134 Tanjong Pagar Road, demanding that the older business change its name. He lost the charge, and both businesses "went on to co-exist peacefully for years". The building continued to serve as the Tiger Balm factory for around 50 years. On 10 August 1961, a fire in the building resulted in the destruction of $3,000 worth of Chinese medicinal products.

The building was purchased by garment maker Singapore Crocodile in 1973. In 1995, the company leased it to the newly-established French Business Centre, which aimed to support French Small and medium-sized enterprises who were looking to set up in Singapore, until 2000. In July 1997, Singapore Crocodile put the property up for sale with an asking price of $22 million. However, the company withdrew the sale as a result of the "depressed property market". In 2007, PayPal moved into the building. In this period, the building also housed eBay and Skype. On 4 December 2019, American fast casual chain Shake Shack announced that it would be opening its second Singaporean outlet in the building. The outlet opened on 7 February 2020, occupying the building's ground floor.
