= Tiger Balm Garden =

Type of public gardens promoting Tiger Balm products

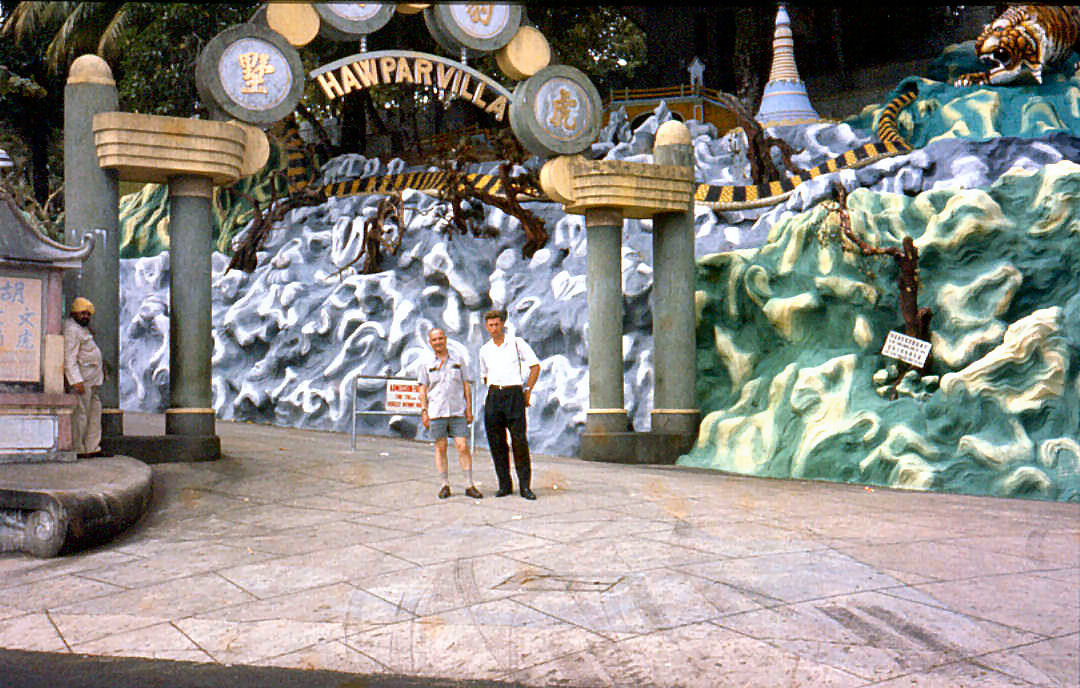
The entrance to Haw Par Villa in the grounds of Tiger Balm Garden in Singapore.

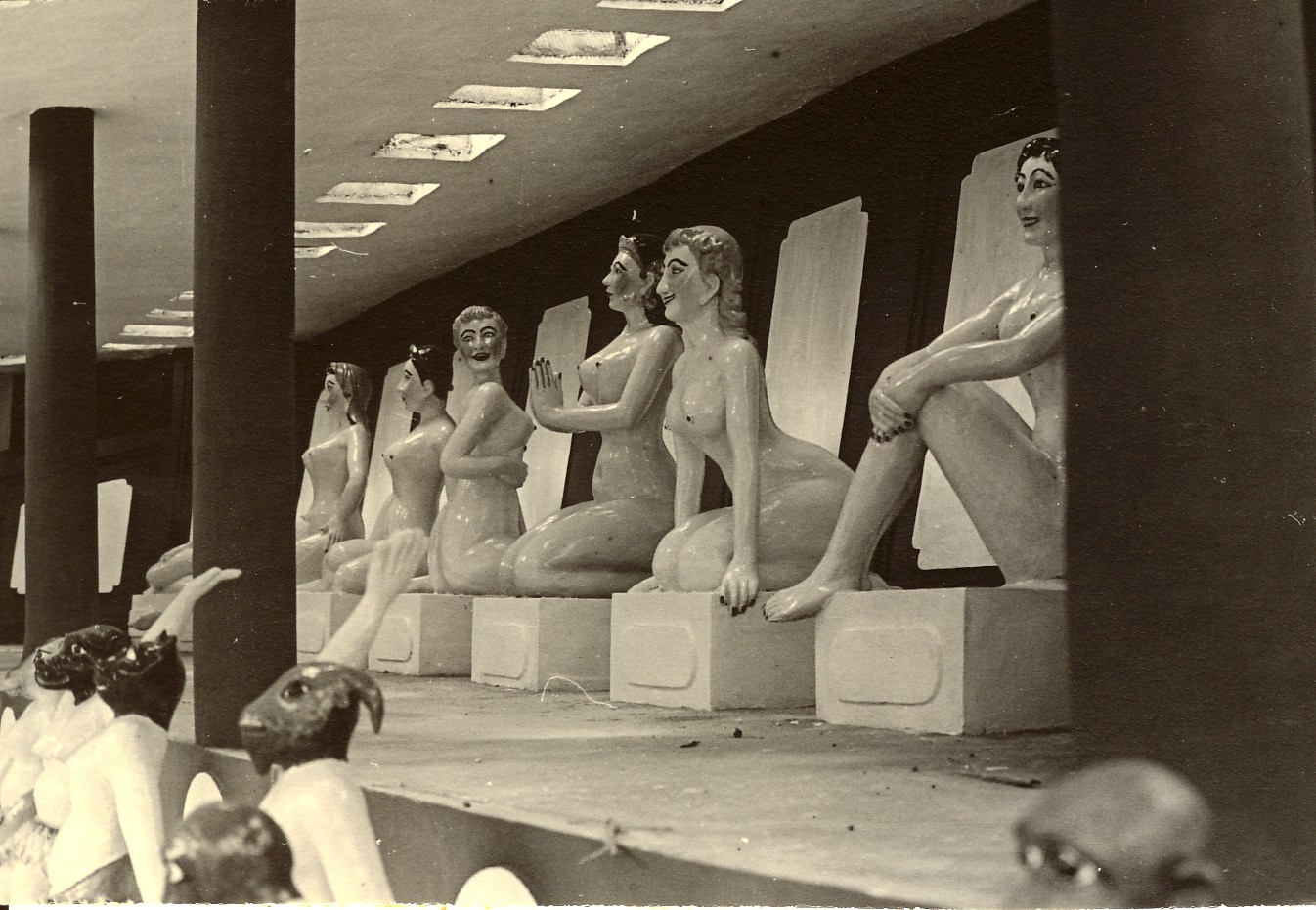
Figures at Tiger Balm Garden Hong Kong in 1965

Tiger Balm Gardens are public gardens that existed or continue to exist in three East Asia locations. They are also known as Haw Par Villa gardens.

All three Tiger Balm Garden locations were built by the Aw family (Aw Boon Haw and Aw Boon Par). They were created to promote the Tiger Balm products produced by the family.

The original garden was located in Hong Kong but is now closed. The second is in Singapore, and a third is in Fujian province of mainland China.

The gardens contain statues and dioramas depicting scenes from Chinese folklore, legends, history and illustrations of various aspects of Confucianism.

== Tiger Balm Gardens at different locations ==
- Tiger Balm Garden (Hong Kong) – Opened in 1935, now closed following redevelopment into the "Haw Par Villa" amusement park in 1985 and then into housing in 1998. The Haw Par Mansion, together with its private garden, is preserved as a museum at the site of the Hong Kong Garden.
- Haw Par Villa (Singapore) – Opened in 1937 and continues as a tourist attraction.
- Tiger Balm Garden (Fujian) – Located in Yongding County, Fujian Province, China; it was founded in 1946, but the location was abandoned in 1949. It reopened in 1994 as a museum. A garden was never built.

== Pop-Culture References ==
- Jojo's Bizarre Adventure - Seen in the fifth episode of Stardust Crusaders (the thirty-first episode of the JoJo's Bizarre Adventure anime) and Chapter 12 of Volume 3 of JoJo's Bizarre Adventure. This episode and chapter feature Jean Pierre Polnareff leading the group to Tiger Balm Garden for his confrontation with Mohammed Avdol.

== Bibliography ==
- TIGER BALM GARDENS A Chinese Billionaire's Fantasy Environments, Judith Brandel & Tina Turbeville, 1998 Aw Boon Haw Foundation ISBN 962 672 052 2
