= Tiger Balm Garden (Hong Kong) =

Former public mansion and gardens in Hong Kong

Coordinates: 22°16′35.1″N 114°11′43.1″E

Haw Par Mansion
- 虎豹別墅
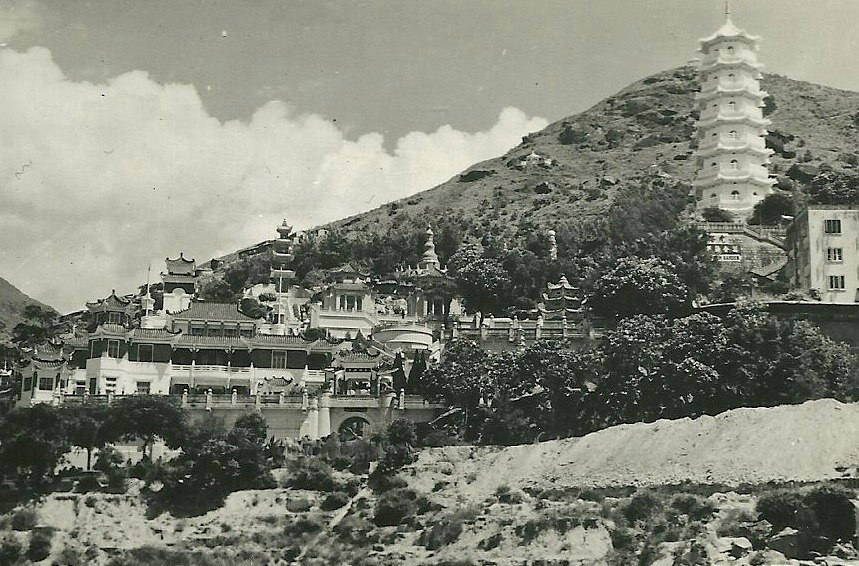
- 1953 picture of the Tiger Pagoda and Haw Par Mansion.
- Interactive map of Haw Par Mansion
- Location: 15 Tai Hang Road, Tai Hang, Wan Chai, Hong Kong
- Area: 3.2 hectares (32,000 m^{2})
- Opened: 1950s
- Founder: Aw Boon Haw
- Designation

Hong Kong Graded Building – Grade I
- Designated: 18 December 2009; 16 years ago

Tiger Balm Garden
- Traditional Chinese: 虎豹別墅
Transcriptions
Yue: Cantonese
- Yale Romanization: Fú paau biht séuih
- Jyutping: Fu2 paau3 bit6 soei5

Tiger Balm Garden
- Traditional Chinese: 萬金油花園
Transcriptions
Yue: Cantonese
- Yale Romanization: Maahn gām yáu fāa yún
- Jyutping: Maan6 gam1 jau2 faa1 jyun2

Aw Boon Haw Garden
- Traditional Chinese: 胡文虎花園
Transcriptions
Yue: Cantonese
- Yale Romanization: Wùh màhn fú fāa yún
- Jyutping: Wu4 man4 fu2 faa1 jyun2

Haw Par Mansion, better known for its public gardens known as Tiger Balm Garden or Aw Boon Haw Garden, was a mansion and gardens located at 15, Tai Hang Road, Tai Hang, Wan Chai District, Hong Kong. The Tiger Balm Garden was demolished for redevelopment in 2004. The Haw Par Mansion and its private garden have been preserved.

The Hong Kong Haw Par Mansion and its formerly adjoining Tiger Balm Garden were one of three Tiger Balm mansions and gardens. The others are located in Singapore (now the Haw Par Villa) and in Fujian province, where the gardens remain.

== History ==
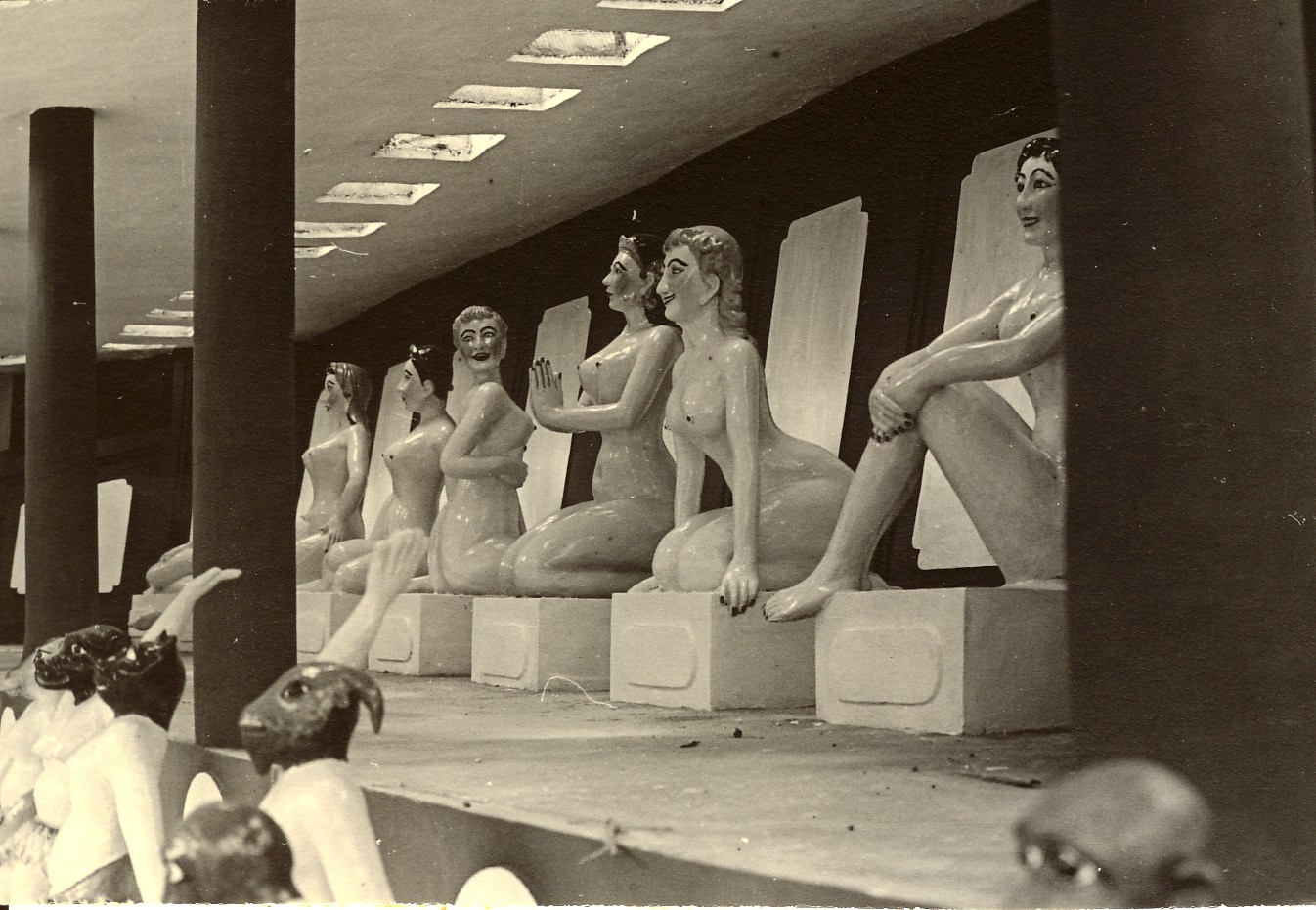
1965 photograph of some of the figures in the garden

The landscaped garden was built at a cost of HK$16 million by Aw Boon Haw and his family in 1935.

In 1961, Aw It Haw (Chinese: 胡一虎), fourth son of late Aw Boon Haw, made an open invitation to the public to buy the land, claiming the land was owned by a family-owned company Haw Par Brothers (Private) Limited (Chinese: 虎豹兄有限公司) chaired by Aw Cheng Chye, son of late Aw Boon Par, which Aw It Haw also claimed that he was authorized by Aw Cheng Chye to published the advertisement of that invitation. However, the head of the flagship business of the late Aw Boon Haw in Hong Kong, Sin Poh Amalgamated (H.K.) Limited, the publisher of Sing Tao Daily, was Aw It Haw's half sister Sally Aw. The lawsuit of the heritage of Aw Boon Haw was settled in 1967.

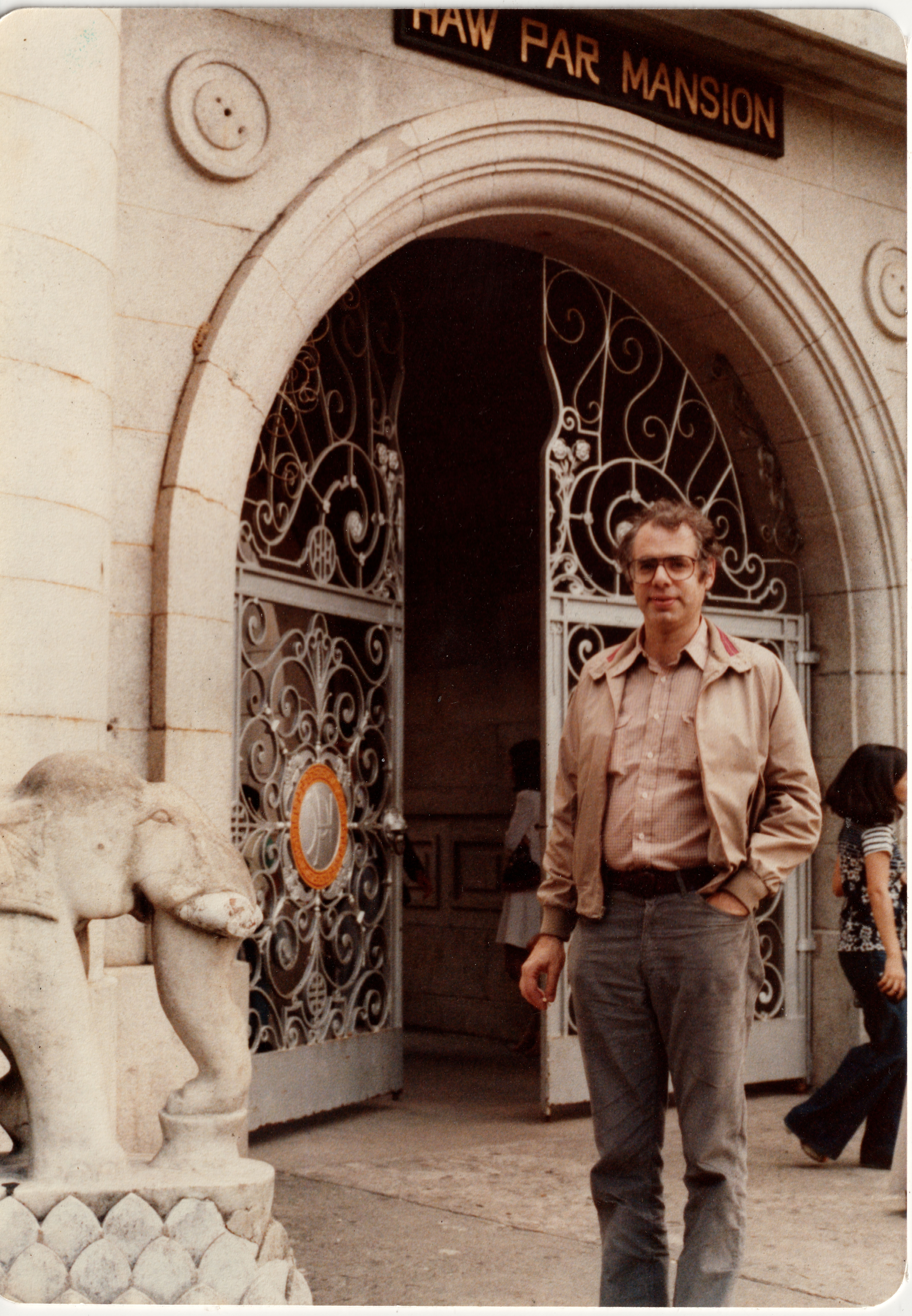
The entrance to the Haw Par Mansion in 1979

In 1978 it was reported that Cheung Kong Holdings was interested to redevelop the area. The purchase price was a reported HK$25 million. Cheung Kong Holdings also purchased the contractual rights that Haw Par Brothers (Private) leasing the land to Haw Par Brothers International for 20 years in 1969 (i.e. 10 year remaining in 1979) for a reported HK$40 million. Cheung Kong Holdings built Ronsdale Garden on the land lease known as Inland Lot No. 5710. It was reported Sally Aw had bought back part of the Tiger Balm Garden and the mansion in 1984, which was known as Inland Lot No. 8972.

In 1985, the garden was converted into the "Haw Par Villa" amusement park. Many of the sculptures were replaced by rides at that time, and were later replaced again by the old statues.

In 1998 the heir to the property, Sally Aw, sold the entire Garden complex to the land development company Cheung Kong (via Metrofond Limited) for redevelopment. In 2001, The Hong Kong Government reached an agreement with Cheung Kong that, as part of the land premium payment, the Hong Kong Antiquities and Monuments Office (AMO) was responsible to preserve and restore the Haw Par Mansion itself together with its private garden as a museum. Cheung Kong only paid HK$943 million as land premium to the government to change the terms in the land lease for redevelopment due to the surrender of the mansion to the government.

When the Tiger Balm Garden was demolished for redevelopment in 2004, many of the garden's murals and statues were salvaged by the AMO. The site of the Garden is now occupied by the residential development The Legend at Jardine's Lookout. Occupancy of the residence started in the first quarter of 2007.

== Features ==
The original gardens covered eight acres (3.2 ha). A seven-storey Tiger Pagoda was the highlight of the garden. Other tourist attractions included artificial Chinese landscaping dotted with sculptures.

== Haw Par Mansion ==
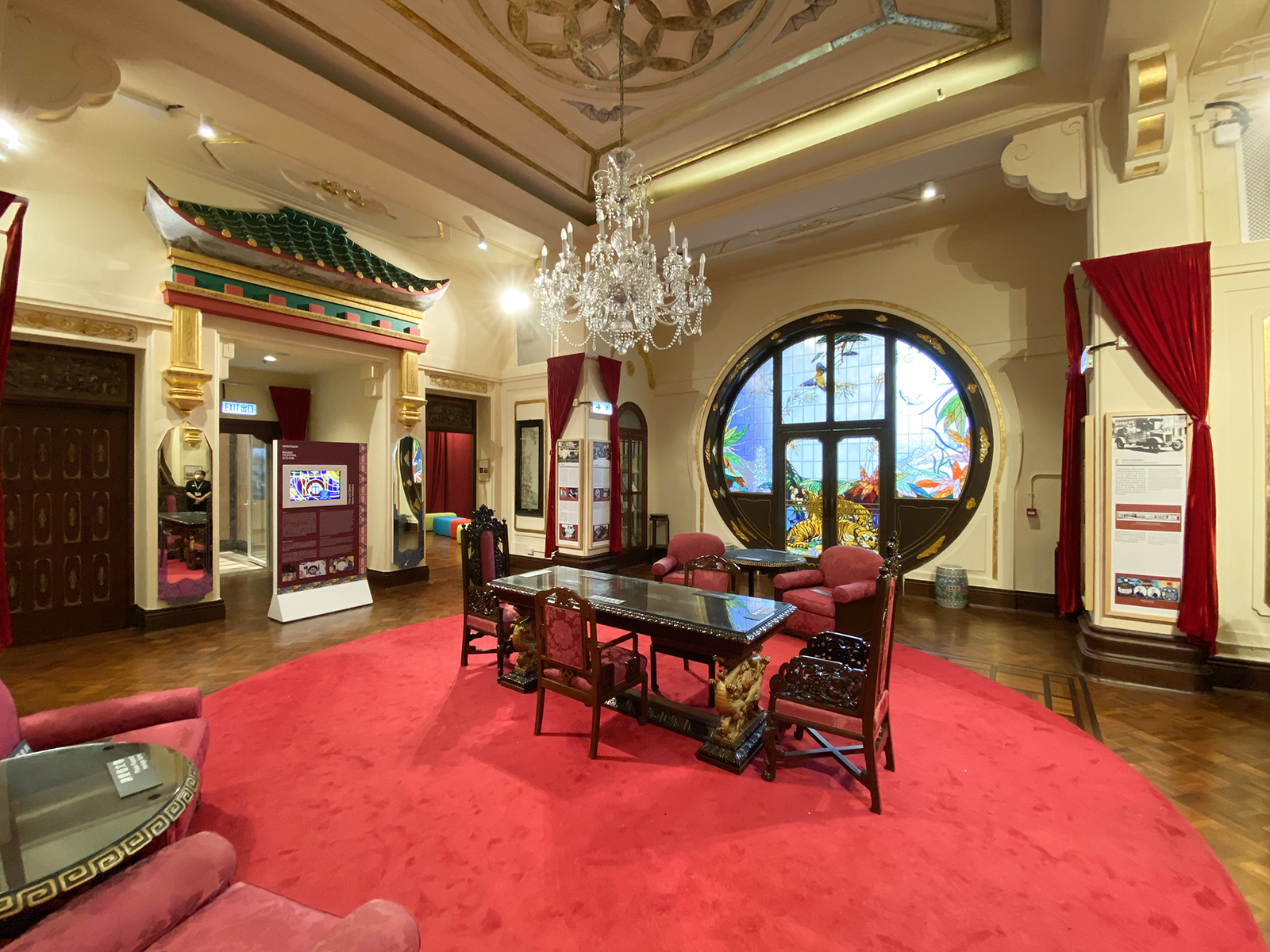
Interior of Haw Par Mansion in 2021.

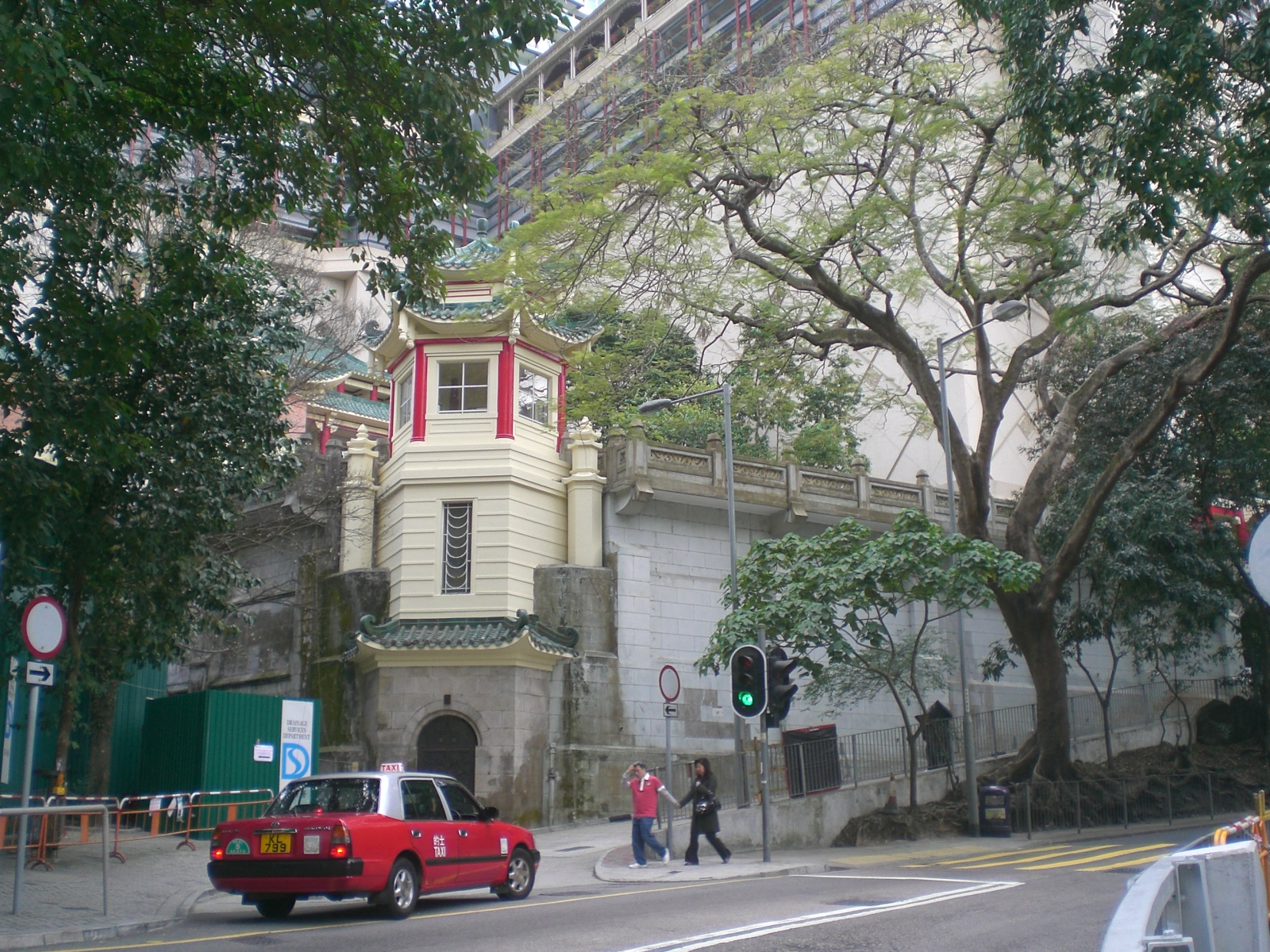
Street level view of Haw Par Mansion, with its pagoda-shaped gateway, in 2009.

The three-storey Haw Par Mansion was the Aw family's residence in Hong Kong. It was built in 1935 in the Chinese Renaissance style. There are more than 500 relics in the Mansion; they underwent restoration and repair. The building became a Grade II historic building in 2000 and was granted Grade I status on 18 December 2009.

== See also ==
- Haw Par Villa, Singapore

== Notes ==
The historic garden is also featured in the Japanese manga series JoJo's Bizarre Adventure: Stardust Crusaders, created by manga artist Hirohiko Araki.
