= Haw Par Corporation =

Singaporean company

- Formerly: Haw Par Brothers International
- Type: public
- Traded as: SGX: H02
- Predecessor: Eng Aun Tong; Haw Par Brothers (Private)
- Founded: 18 July 1969; 57 years ago
- Founder: Aw Cheng Chye and family member
- Key people: Wee Ee-Chao (Chairperson); Wee Ee Lim (CEO)
- Brands: Tiger; Tiger Balm; Kwan Loong
- Revenue: ▲ S$202 million (2016)
- Operating income: ▼ S$137 million (2016)
- Net income: ▼ S$125 million (2016)
- Total assets: ▼ S$2.636 billion (2016)
- Total equity: ▼ S$2.476 billion (2016)
- Owner: Wee Cho Yaw family (35.86%)
- Subsidiaries: Haw Par Healthcare
- Website: www.hawpar.com

Haw Par Corporation Limited
- Traditional Chinese: 虎豹企業有限公司
- Simplified Chinese: 虎豹企业有限公司
Transcriptions
Yue: Cantonese
- Jyutping: Fu2 Paau3 Kei5 Jip6 Jau5 Haan6 Gung1 Si1
Southern Min
- Hokkien POJ: Hó͘-pà Khì-gia̍p Iú-hān Kong-si

Haw Par Brothers International Limited
- Traditional Chinese: 虎豹兄弟國際有限公司
Transcriptions
Yue: Cantonese
- Jyutping: Fu2 Paau3 Hing1 Dai6 Gwok3 Zai3 Jau5 Haan6 Gung1 Si1
Southern Min
- Hokkien POJ: Hó͘-pà Hiaⁿ-tī Kok-chè Iú-hān Kong-si

Eng Aun Tong
- Traditional Chinese: 永安堂
Transcriptions
Yue: Cantonese
- Jyutping: Wing5 On1 Tong4
Southern Min
- Hokkien POJ: Éng-an-tông

Tiger Balm
- Traditional Chinese: 虎標
- Literal meaning: Tiger Brand
Transcriptions
Yue: Cantonese
- Jyutping: Fu2 Biu1
Southern Min
- Hokkien POJ: Hó͘-phiau

Kwan Loong
- Traditional Chinese: 均隆
Transcriptions
Yue: Cantonese
- Jyutping: Gwan1 Lung4
Southern Min
- Hokkien POJ: Kun-liông

Haw Par Corporation Limited is a Singaporean company involved in healthcare, pharmaceuticals, leisure products, property and investment. It is the company responsible for Tiger Balm branded liniment (ointment). Its brands also included Kwan Loong and it also owns and operates weekend and leisure time destinations such as oceanariums.

The Haw Par Group owns two oceanariums: the now-defunct Underwater World oceanarium attraction at Sentosa, Singapore, and Underwater World Pattaya in Thailand.

== History ==
=== Predecessors ===
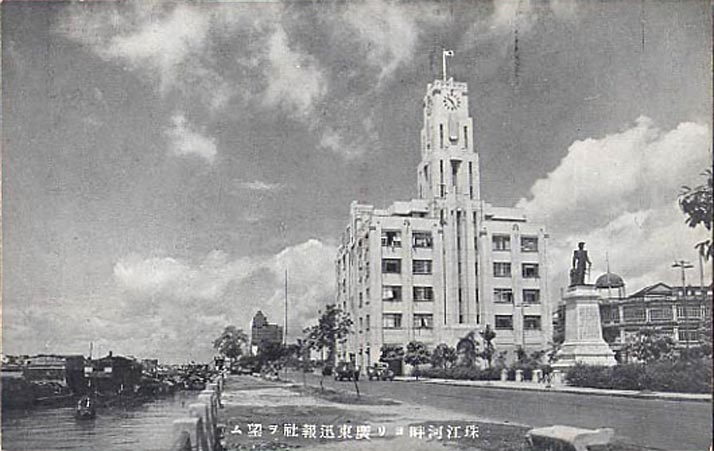
Eng Aun Tong Building in Guangzhou, circa 1939. It was nationalized by the People's Republic of China in 1949.

The predecessor of Haw Par Corporation, Eng Aun Tong, was founded by Aw Chu Kin, father of Aw Boon Haw and Boon Par brothers. Eng Aun Tong was then relocated to Singapore and expanded its branch to many Chinese communities in Asia. Aw Boon Haw also built Haw Par Villas in Hong Kong, Singapore and in Yongding District, Longyan, China. A private company, Haw Par Brothers (Private) Limited was incorporated in 1932 as a holding company for a vast majority of the family assets.

=== Establishment, IPO and family dispute ===
Haw Par Brothers International Limited was incorporated on 18 July 1969 by the Aw family (descendant of the late Aw Boon Haw and Boon Par brothers), in order to list most of the assets of Haw Par Brothers (Private) Limited on the Stock Exchange of Malaysia and Singapore. The assets included the brand Eng Aun Tong and Tiger Balm for liniment products, Sin Poh (Star News) Amalgamated that publishes newspaper in Singapore and Malaysia (the latter assets were split into part of what is now SPH Media for Singaporean branch and Media Chinese International for Malaysian branch), as well as subsidiaries in Hong Kong, Taiwan and Thailand. (Note: Haw Par Brothers (Hong Kong) Limited, Haw Par Brothers Eng Aun Tong (Taiwan) Limited and Haw Par Brothers (Thailand) Limited respectively) The company also owned an equity investment in Chung Khiaw Bank (Chinese: 祟僑銀行), as well as a lease contract that signed between Haw Par Brothers International and Haw Par Brothers (Private), to use the Tiger Balm Gardens in Hong Kong and Singapore that were owned by the latter. The shares started to trade in the exchange in November 1969.

The listed company made a major disinvestment in 1970, selling Hong Kong Eng Aun Tong building located in Wan Chai Road for HK$2.8 million, in order to raise fund the Hong Kong subsidiary for other investment. Nevertheless, the actual price was disputed, as the buyer told the press in Hong Kong another figure.

However, a year after IPO, Aw family sold the controlling stake of the family to Slater Walker, At the same time Sin Poh (Star News) Amalgamated was privatized by Aw Cheng Chye (Chinese: 胡清才), eldest son of the late Aw Boon Par. Aw Cheng Chye also bought back some of the shares from Slater Walker. Haw Par Brothers International also sold 49.8% stake of Chung Khiaw Bank to United Overseas Bank for S$22 million. Aw Cheng Chye was also re-elected as the chairman of Haw Par Brothers International despite the takeover. After the sudden death of Aw Cheng Chye during a trip in Santiago de Chile in August 1971, as well as re-election of the board of directors, it was reported that the listed company was chaired by Richard Tarling while Haw Par Brothers (Private) Limited was chaired by Aw It Haw (Chinese: 胡一虎), the fourth and the first biological son of the late Aw Boon Haw.

Aw Kow (Chinese: 胡蛟), the eldest (adopted) son of the late Aw Boon Haw, who resigned as the director of Sin Poh (Star News) Amalgamated and the managing director of Sin Chew Jit Poh in May 1971 due to his personal investment in Eastern Sun, also sued Haw Par Brothers (Private) Limited in 1972 for blocking him to read its accounts and financial statements, claiming under the late Aw Cheng Chye, the company allowed personal spending of Aw Cheng Chye, was invoiced by the company itself. The lawsuit was settled in 1977, in favour Aw Kow.

In the autobiography Escape from Paradise by John & May Chu Harding, they also claimed that Aw Cheng Chye's decision to make Haw Par Brothers International public, was against the wish of the part of the Aw family. May Chu Harding, née Lee, was the great-granddaughter of Aw Boon Par, or granddaughter of Lee Chee Shan and Aw Cheng Hu. Lee Chee Shan was the president of Chung Khiaw Bank in 1971.

Under Aw Cheng Chye as chairman, Haw Par Brothers (Private) also attempted to sell Tiger Balm Garden of Hong Kong in 1961; the last piece of the garden was sold to Cheung Kong in 1998 and the main building of the mansion was donated to the Hong Kong Government.

=== Expansion under Slater Walker ===
After Haw Par Brothers International was taken over by Slater Walker in June 1971, the new owner changed Haw Par Brothers International from a family-held business into a true business enterprise. Slater Walker also sold 20% stake of Haw Par Brothers International to Slater Walker's associate company Australian Industrial and Mining Corporation (Austim) in November 1971, as well as a second listing of Haw Par Brothers International on the Hong Kong Stock Exchange and in the London Stock Exchange. Austim sold 55% stake of Motor and General Investment Underwriters Holdings Singapore to Haw Par Brothers International in August 1971. It was announced that the Holdings would purchase a Singapore construction company Scott & English (Chinese: 錦泰) in September 1971.

In January 1972, after the resignation of both Lee Aik Sim (Lee Santipongchai, Chinese: 李益森), and his wife Aw Cheng Sin (Suri Santipongchai, Chinese: 胡清心), the daughter of late Aw Boon Par as the directors of Haw Par Brothers (Thailand) the subsidiary was sold in the same month to Jack Chia (Chinese: 謝志正). Jack Chia and Haw Par Brothers International also formed a joint venture, which the joint venture have the rights to use "Tiger Balm" brand. In March 1972 Haw Par Brothers International acquired fellow pharmaceutical company in Chinese medicines, Hong Kong listed company Kwan Loong & Co., However, Slater Walker turned the Hong Kong company into an investment vehicle in financial market, which was known as Slater Walker Securities (Hong Kong).

In April 1972, Haw Par Brothers International made a strategic investment on a property on 302 Orchard Road.

In 1973 the company expanded to Japan as well as bought 29% stake of a London-listed company London Tin Corporation. Haw Par Brothers International financed the deal by a proposed recapitalization. The stake was sold in 1976 and the sub-holding company that Haw Par Brothers International established in London, was sold in 1982.

=== Collapse of Slater Walker ===
The parent company Slater Walker was collapsed after the secondary banking crisis of 1973–75; the company was bailed out by the Bank of England. For Haw Par Brothers International itself, financial irregularities were exposed, for which former chairman Tarling was jailed for 6 months in 1979. Since 13 December 1978, the company has been chaired by Singaporean banker, Wee Cho Yaw. As of 30 March 2020, Wee, through his family investment vehicle, owns 36.23% of the company's shares.

== Subsidiaries, brands and products ==
Kwan Loong (Chinese: 均隆) originated from a different listed company of the same name (Kwan Loong & Co., Chinese: 均隆號), which was acquired in March 1972. It produces medicated oil, specifically 驅風油, literally "oil that expels headaches." (Note: Word for word, Chinese: 風 means wind, but Chinese: 頭風; lit. 'head wind' means headache; a less frequent usage was Chinese: 肚風; lit. 'stomach wind', describing not feeling well in the stomach. However, Kwan Loong and another maker of 驅風油 claimed other medical applications of the oil, such as dizziness and giddiness; other companies translated the oil as "universal oil", such as the oil made by Axe Brand Universal Oil.) Earlier medicated oil products, such as Axe Brand Universal Oil translated the oil as "universal oil" (in that the ointment could be used for a wide variety of ailments).

== Gallery ==
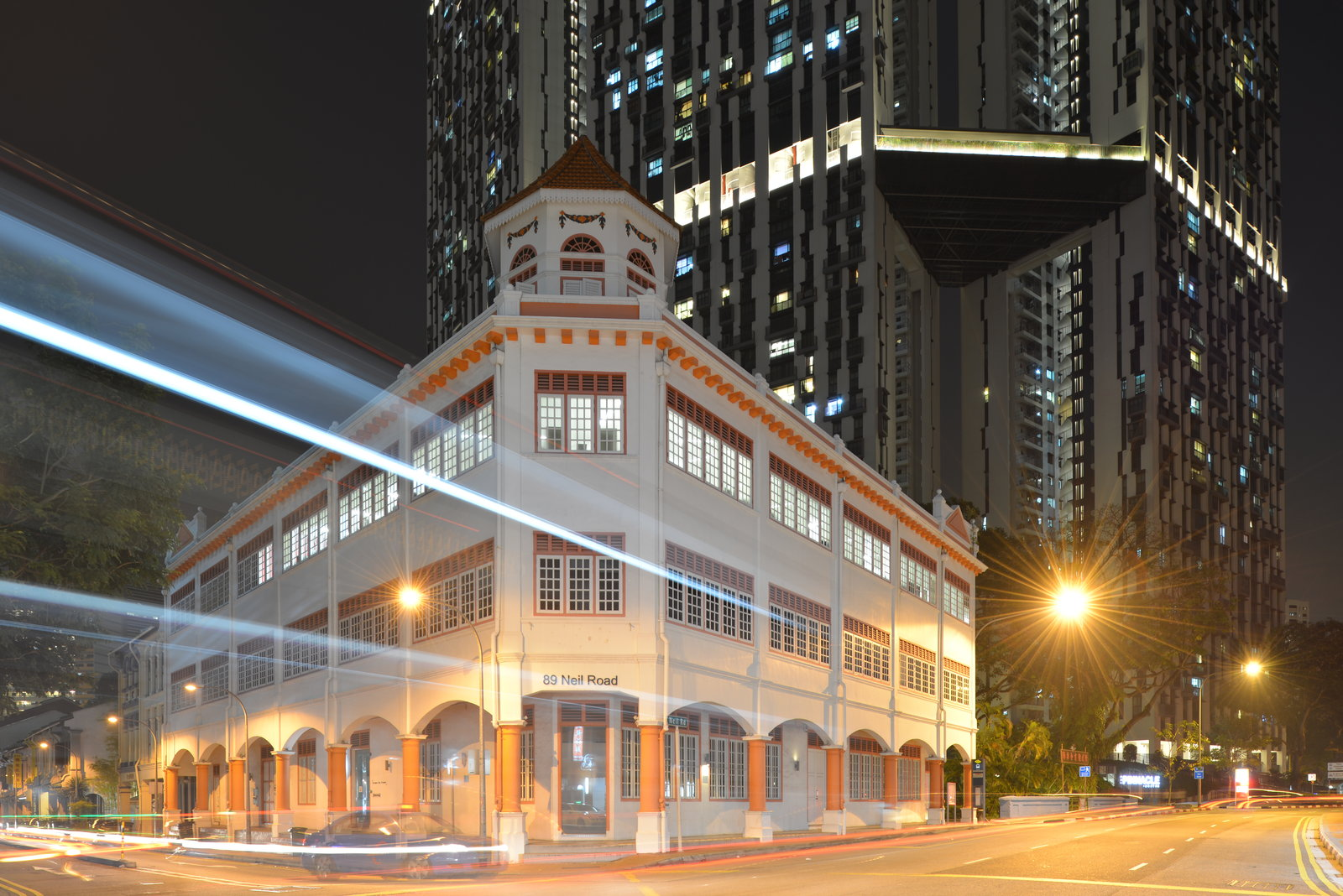
Former Eng Aun Tong in Singapore. Photographed in 2012

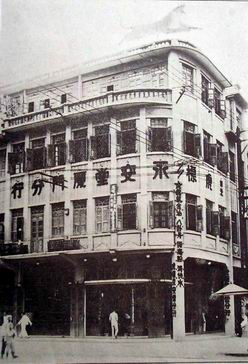
Eng Aun Tong Building in Xiamen, c. 1930s. It was nationalized by the PRC in 1949

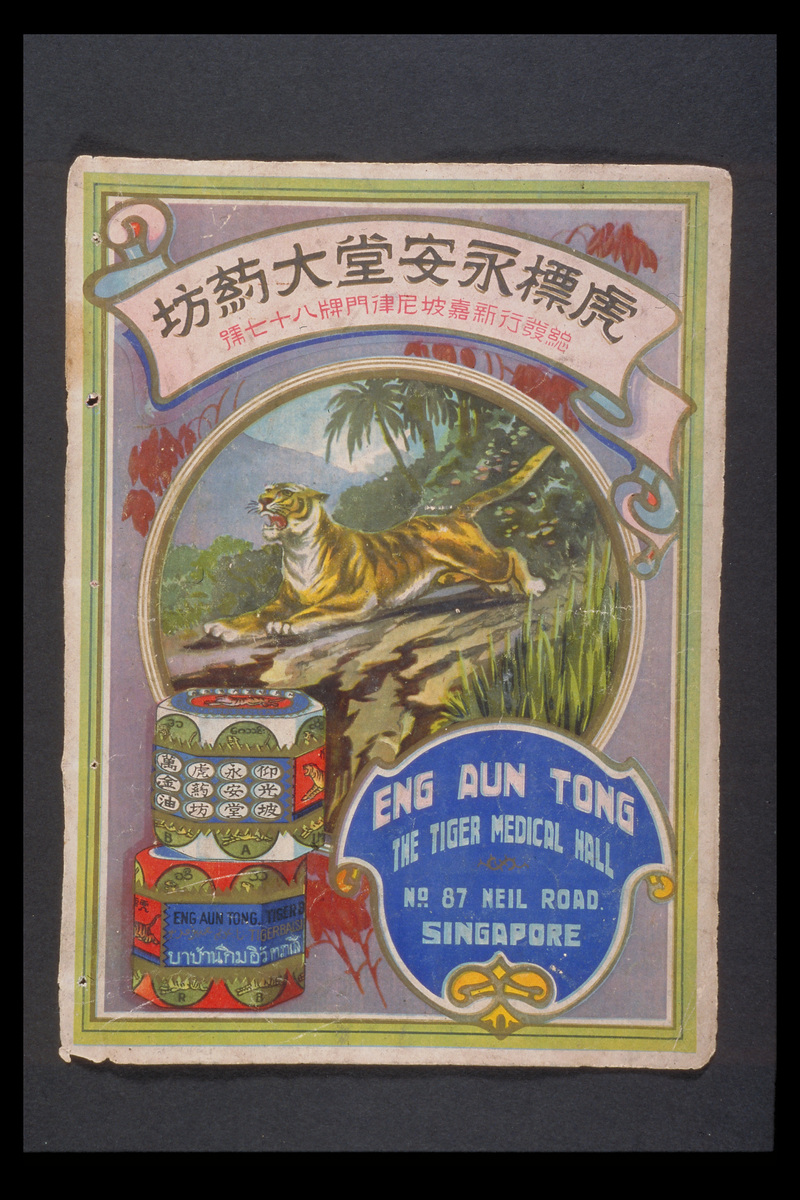
1930s Eng Aun Tong ad

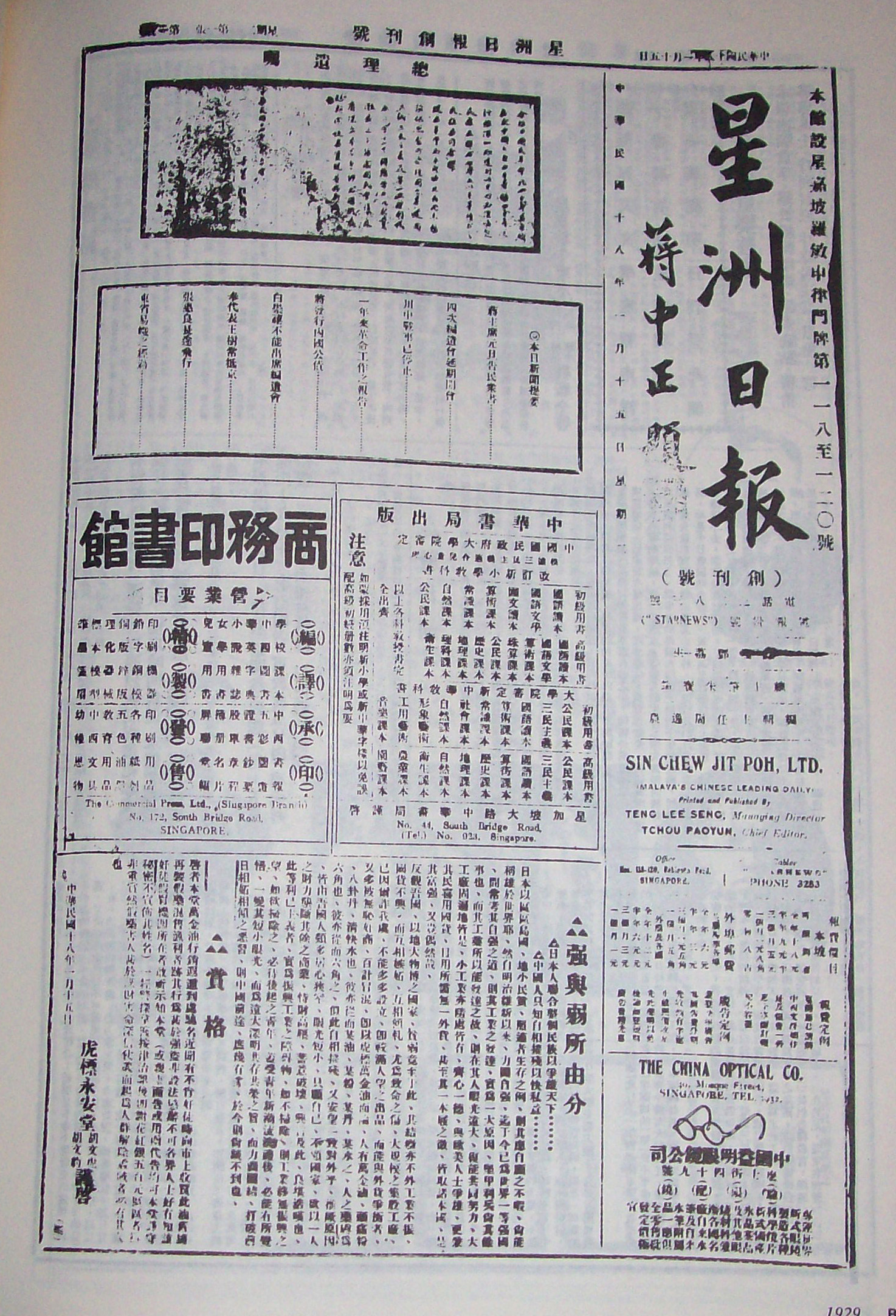
First issue of Sin Chew Jit Poh in 1929. Sin Chew Jit Poh was the product of Haw Par Brothers International from 1969 to 1971
