= Siddhalepa =

Siddhalepa Group

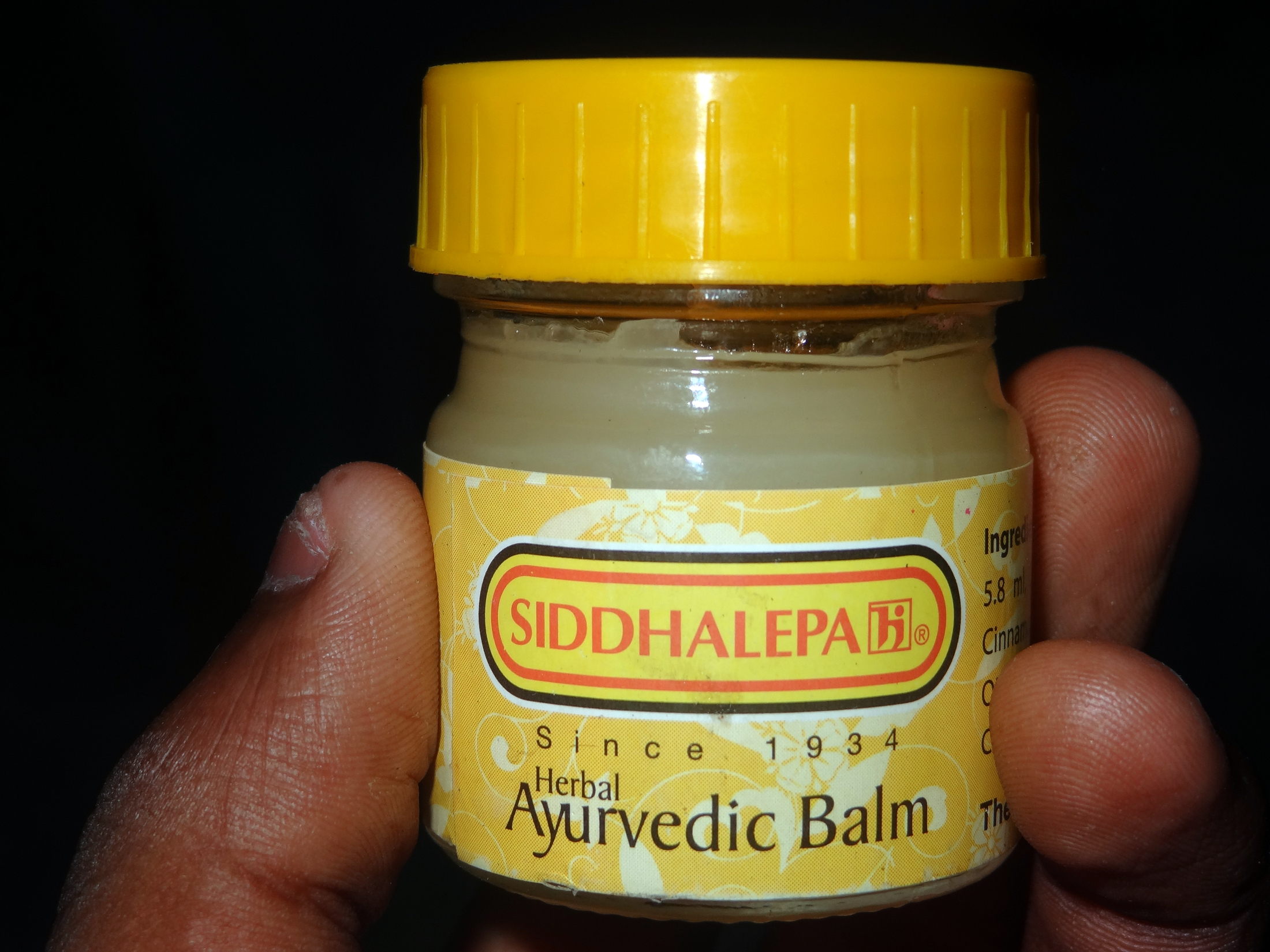
- Industry: medicine
- Founded: Sri Lanka (1971)
- Headquarters: Ratmalana, Sri Lanka
- Key people: Victor Hettigoda, Founder
- Products: Siddhalepa balm Supirivicky; Sumudu; Visaka
- Revenue: ▲US $1.0 billion (2013)
- Website: www.siddhalepa.com

Siddhalepa is a Hettigoda Group owned brand of over 150 Ayurveda based medicines and wellness products produced in Sri Lanka. It exports its products across the world.

== History ==
Siddhalepa was founded by Victor Hettigoda in 1971 with Rs. 2500. Hettigoda first sold the product by traveling around the country convincing boutique owners and small retailers of its effectiveness.

== Awards ==
- 2021 Siddhalepa Spray won the International Innovation Award
