= Tiger Balm =

Heat rub used for pain relief

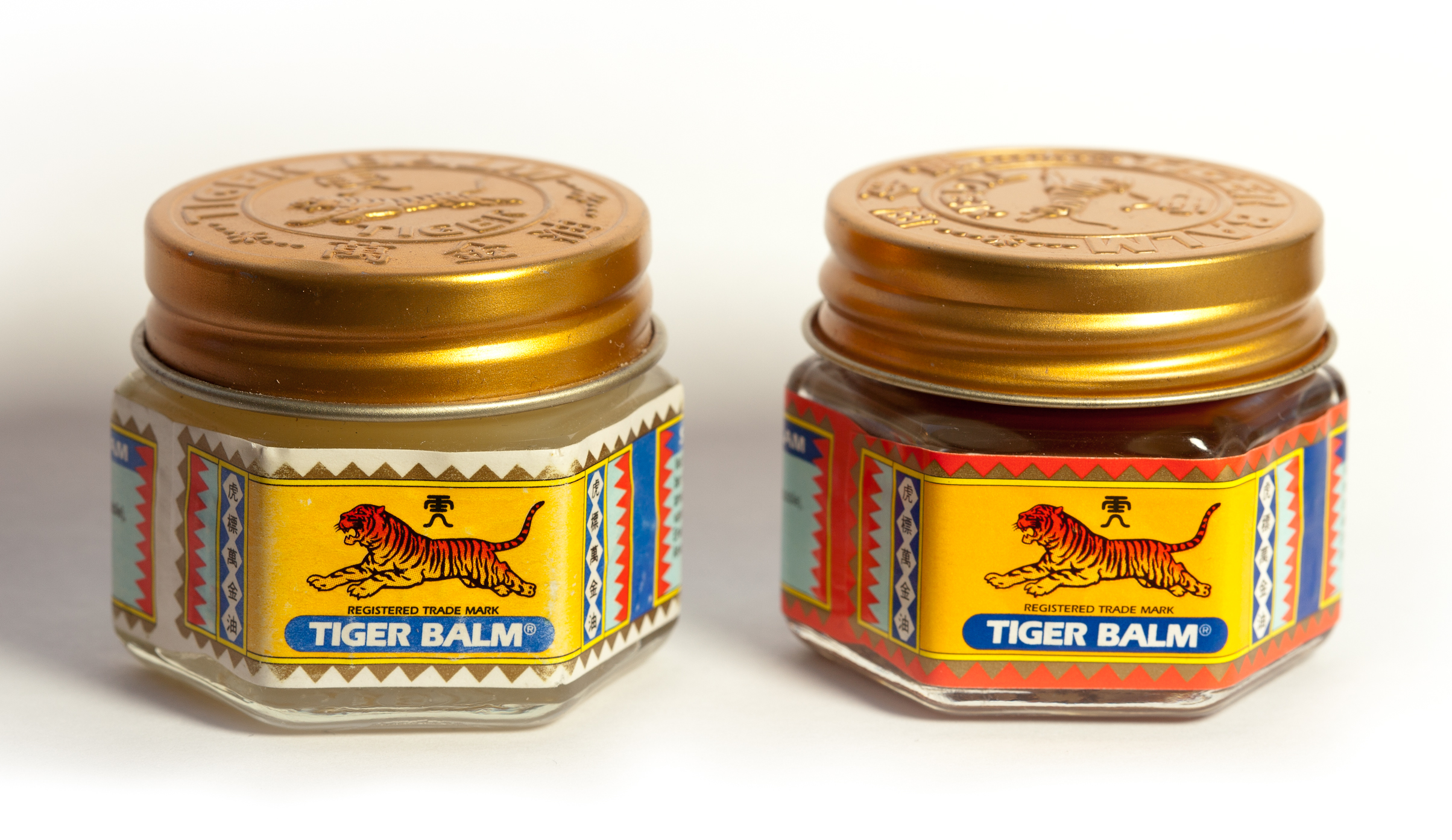
The white and red versions of Haw Par Tiger Balm

Tiger Balm (Chinese: 虎標萬金油; pinyin: Hǔbiao Wànjīnyóu; Pe̍h-ōe-jī: Hó͘-phiau Bān-kim-iû) is an analgesic heat rub manufactured and distributed by Singaporean company Haw Par Healthcare. It is used for external pain relief.

== History ==
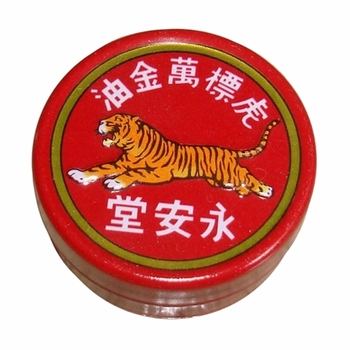
Tiger Balm Red

A precursor to Tiger Balm called Ban Kin Yu (Chinese: 萬金油; lit. 'Ten Thousand Golden Oil') was developed in the 1870s in Rangoon, Burma, during the British colonial era by the practising Chinese herbalist Aw Chu Kin, son of Aw Leng Fan, a Chinese Hakka herbalist in Zhongchuan, Fujian Province, China. His father had sent him to Rangoon in the 1860s to help in his uncle's herbal shop. Eventually, Aw Chu Kin himself set up a family business named Eng Aun Tong 永安堂 ("Hall of Everlasting Peace"). On his deathbed in 1908, he asked his sons Aw Boon Haw and Aw Boon Par to perfect the product. In 1918, the product was renamed "Tiger Balm" in order to gain broader appeal. By 1918, the Aw family had become one of the wealthiest in Rangoon. By the 1920s, the brothers had turned Eng Aun Tong into a very successful business empire that produced and marketed pharmaceutical products, including the Tiger Balm medicinal ointment. Tiger Balm sold well in Burma, and was exported to China, Japan, and Southeast Asia.

The brothers moved to Singapore in the 1920s due to problems with the colonial British government. They set up a branch first at Amoy Street, then moved to Cecil Street and finally to 89 Neil Road between 1924 and 1926, at the junction of Neil and Craig Road. The Aw family founded the Tiger Balm Gardens in Hong Kong in 1935, Singapore in 1937 and Fujian Province in 1946 to promote the product. Boon Haw also established newspapers in China and Singapore; his daughter said that he spent so much money on advertising that "he thought it would be cheaper to just open a few newspapers".

Between 1971 and 1991, Haw Par Corporation licensed the making and distribution of Tiger Balm to another company. After 20 years, Haw Par took back control of the Tiger Balm and started making changes to its products. It introduced products such as muscle, neck and shoulder rubs, and also began selling products as gels and plasters.

In 2013, a lawsuit filed by Haw Par against the Indian company Rangoon Chemical Works, asserting that the latter's "Flying Tiger" balm with similar branding infringed on the Tiger Balm trademark, reached the Supreme Court of India. As a result, Rangoon Chemical Works made changes in the branding of its product and redesigned packaging.

In 2018, there were 10 products being sold under the Tiger Balm brand, in over 100 countries. Tiger Balm generated S$152 million (US$110.56 million) in revenues in 2015. Haw Par's revenues from Tiger Balm sales in India were ₹85 crore (US$12.43 million) in 2018. The product sold in India is manufactured in Hyderabad by Makson and marketed by Alkem Laboratories. Between 1993 and 2011, it had been manufactured and marketed by Elder Pharmaceuticals.

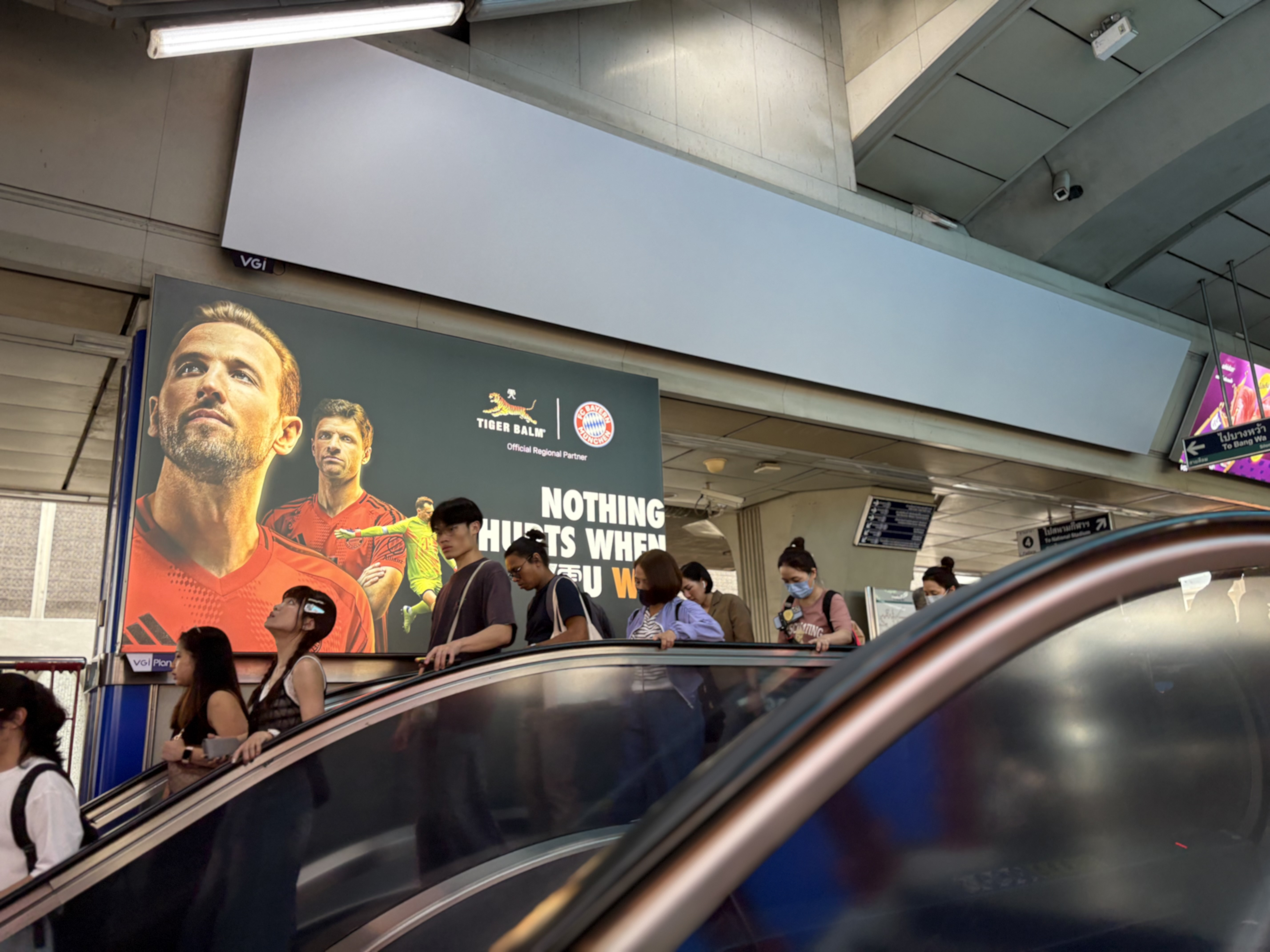
An advert in Siam Station, Bangkok showcasing the brand's partnership with FC Bayern Munich

In 2024, Tiger Balm became an official regional partner of FC Bayern Munich for China, Malaysia, Singapore, Thailand, and Vietnam for four years.

== Composition ==
Ingredient	Red	White	Ultra
Menthol	10%	8%	11%
Camphor	11% or 25%	11% or 25%	11%
Dementholised mint oil	6%	16%	6%
Cajuput oil	7%	13%	13%
Clove bud oil	5%	1.5%	2%

The base comprises petroleum jelly and paraffin wax. The packaging label states that the active ingredients are menthol and camphor.

The camphor concentration varies by country of sale; as of November 2023, Tiger Balm Red and Tiger Balm White both contain 25% camphor in Singapore and Cambodia, but only 11% in Australia as an example. This is likely due to different regulatory requirements.

== See also ==
- Axe Brand Universal Oil
- Amrutanjan (balm)
- Ben-Gay
- Liniment
- IcyHot
- Mentholatum
- Siddhalepa
- Vicks VapoRub
- Ya mong
