= Aw Chu Kin =

Burmese Chinese herbalist

Aw Chu Kin (Chinese: 胡子钦 ? – 1908 in Rangoon, British Burma) was a Burmese Chinese herbalist. He is best known as the original inventor of Tiger Balm.

Aw's father was a Chinese herbology practitioner in Xiamen and a Hakka Chinese with ancestry in Yongding County. Being of a poor background, Aw first immigrated to Singapore where he stayed at the kongsi of his clan. He then moved to Penang and started to work as a practitioner of Traditional Chinese medicine, known as a sinseh (Chinese: 先生) in Penang Hokkien. Afterwards, he moved to Rangoon where, with the help of his uncle, founded his apothecary named Eng Aun Tong (Chinese: 永安堂; lit. 'The Hall of Eternal Peace') in 1870.

Aw Chu-Kin got married in Rangoon. He had three sons, the eldest of whom, Boon-Leng (Gentle/Refined Dragon) died young. He was survived by his two sons, Boon-Haw (Gentle/Refined Tiger) and Boon-Par (Gentle/Refined Leopard). In 1892, Aw sent Boon-Haw to his grandfather's village to be instructed in traditional Chinese methods while Boon-Par stayed in Rangoon to receive British education. He left his business to younger son Boon-Par who then called his elder brother to run Eng Aun Tong together.
