= Escape from Paradise =

2001 book written by John Harding and May Chu Harding

Escape from Paradise: From Third World to First is a 2001 non-fiction book written by John Harding and May Chu Harding set in Singapore, Brunei, Australia, England, and the United States. The book tells, from the author's perspective, of her struggle to divorce her ex-husband, Hin Chew Chung, whom she married in an arranged marriage in Singapore. She encountered difficulties with Singapore's lawyers and judges that made the divorce difficult.

== Circulation restrictions ==
Escape from Paradise was never banned in Singapore. This has been confirmed by Singapore's Media Development Authority (MDA). Its distribution in Singapore bookstores and in Singapore's National Library (NLB) was restricted by a threatened lawsuit by Helen Yeo, wife of former Singapore Cabinet Minister Yeo Cheow Tong. Consequently, twenty-five copies of the book were withdrawn from NLB and only one copy of Escape from Paradise is still in circulation as a reference book at the National Library.
