= Aw Boon Haw =

Burmese Chinese businessman (1882-1954)

- 胡文虎
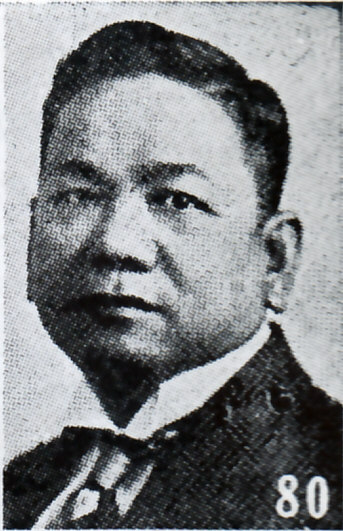
- Aw in The Most Recent Biographies of Chinese Dignitaries
- Born: 1882; Rangoon, British Burma
- Died: 1954 (aged 71–72); Honolulu, Hawaii, US
- Other names: Balm King; Tiger Balm King
- Occupations: entrepreneur; philanthropist
- Known for: Haw Par Villas (his mansions); Tiger Balm (product of his company)
- Board member of: Eng Aun Tong
- Spouses: Tay Piah Hong; Tan Kyi Kyi; Ooi Geik Cheah; Khoo Siew Eng
Children
Aw Kow	(son)
Aw Swan	(son, adopted)
Aw Hoe	(son, deceased in 1951)
Aw It Haw	(son)
Aw Jee Haw	(son, died in wartime)
Aw Sar Haw	(ditto)
Aw Sin Haw	(son)
Sally Aw	(daughter)
Aw Seng	(daughter)
- Parent: Aw Chu Kin (Father)
- Relatives: Aw Boon Par (Younger brother)

Aw Boon-Haw (Chinese: 胡文虎; pinyin: Hú Wénhǔ; Pe̍h-ōe-jī: Ô͘ Bûn-hó͘; 1882–1954), OBE, was a Burmese-Chinese entrepreneur and philanthropist best known as founder of Tiger Balm. He was a son of Hakka herbalist Aw Chu-Kin, with his ancestral home in Yongding County, Fujian, China.

== Career ==
Aw was a Burmese born to a Chinese herbalist father in Rangoon (now known as Yangon), Burma on 1882 under the British colonial government. In 1918, Aw perfected the product and it was renamed "Tiger Balm" in order to gain broader appeal. By 1918, the Aw family had become one of the wealthiest families in Rangoon. Tiger Balm sold well in Burma, and was exported to China, Japan, and Southeast Asia. In 1926, due to problems with the British Colonial government at the time, Aw migrated to Malaysia and expanded their business overseas to Southeast Asia, where he cofounded the business with his brother. Aw used cartoon commercialisation to promote his Tiger Balm product, named after himself, to any potential customers as well as at any public celebration. In the 1920s, his main factory, Eng Aun Tong, was set up at 89 Neil Road, Chinatown, Singapore. Aw also founded several newspapers, including Sin Chew Jit Poh, Sin Pin Jit Poh, and Sing Tao Daily.

Aw fled to Hong Kong during World War II and managed the business from there, while his brother stayed in Singapore until he closed down the factory and went to Rangoon. Aw returned to Singapore after the end of World War II and re-established his business. He set up Chung Khiaw Bank and once owned Pulau Serangoon (present day Coney Island), Singapore.

== Death ==
In 1954, at the age of 72, Aw died from a heart attack following a major operation in Honolulu while on a trip to Hong Kong from Boston. He is remembered through his work with Haw Par Villas throughout Asia, with locations in Singapore, Hong Kong, and the Fujian province of China.

== Legacy ==
In 1932, Aw and his brother Aw Boon Par founded St. John Hospital in Cheung Chau. As of 2023, the original building, a historical landmark, continues to serve the approximate 12,000 residents of the island.

His sons took over his businesses after Aw's death.

== Personal life ==
Aw had an adopted daughter, Sally Aw, a businesswoman and former politician. Born in Rangoon as the daughter of Aw Boon Haw and his fourth wife, Aw Seng (胡星), Sally has resided in Hong Kong and Singapore and set up a company under her father's name, Aw Boon Haw Pte Ltd, to continue the heritage and legacy of her father. Aw Seng died on 10 April 2012 in Vancouver, Canada, aged 100.

== Gallery ==
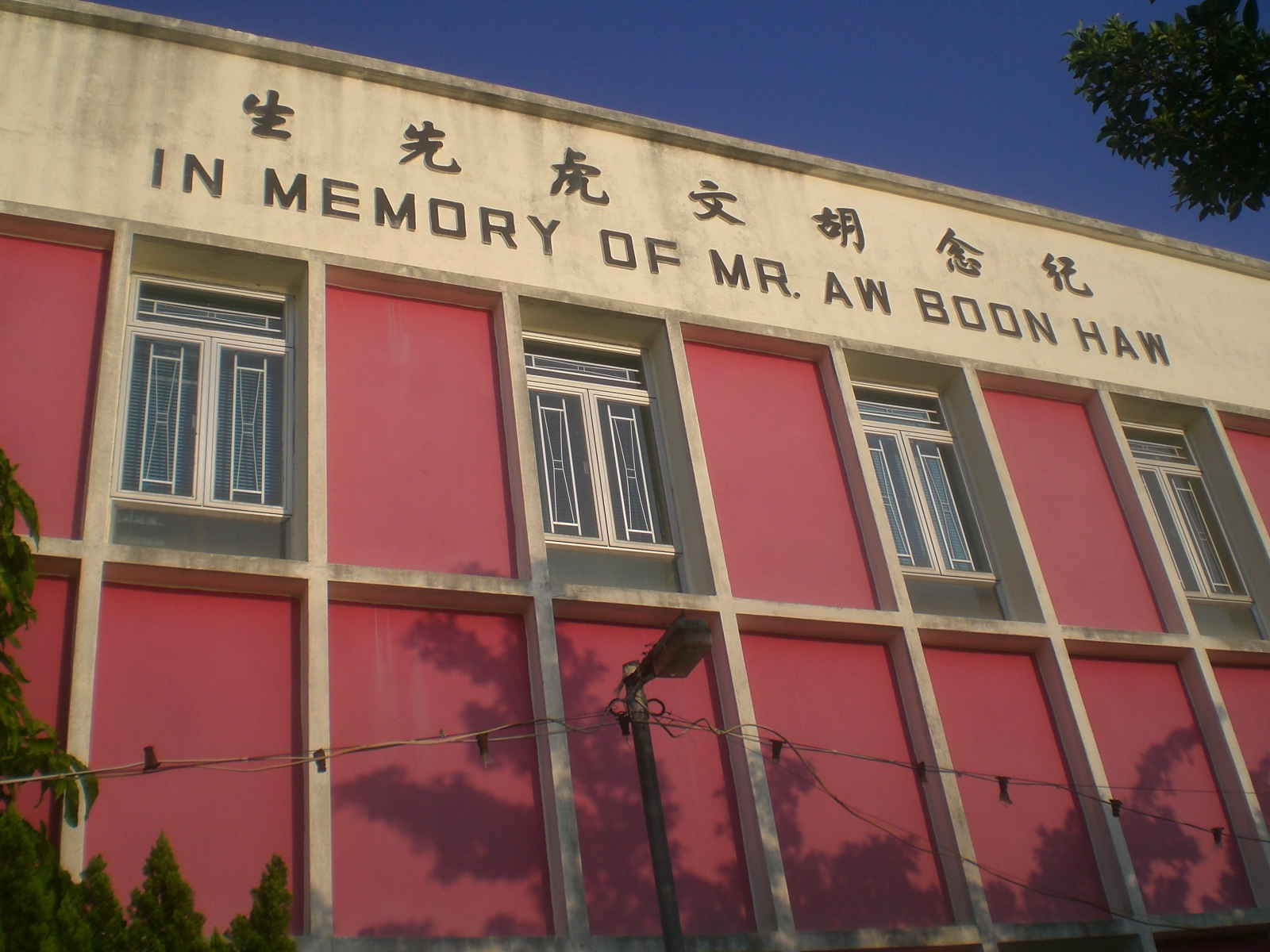
A memorial hall in Lei Yue Mun Waterfront School

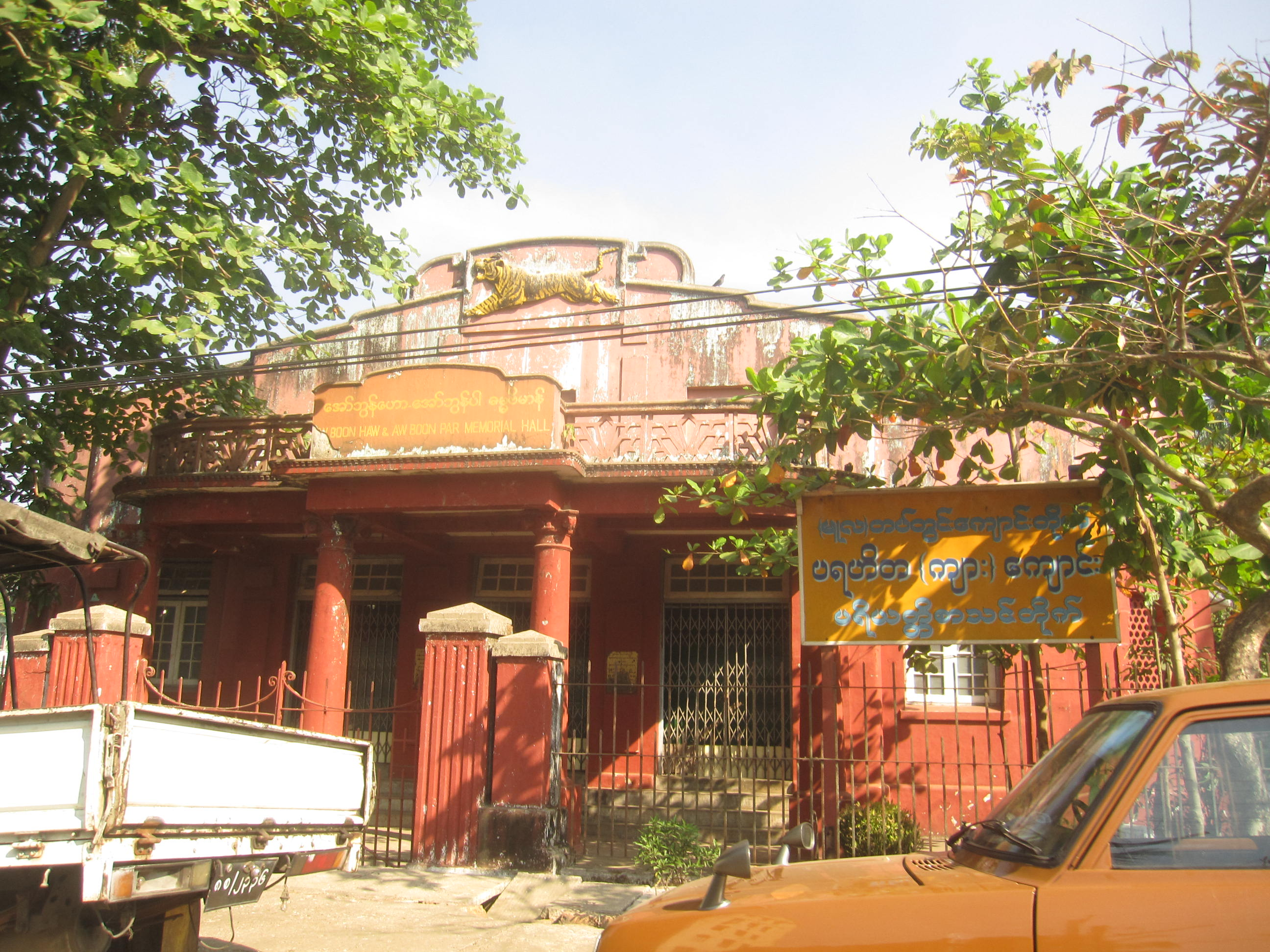
Aw Boon-Haw & Aw Boon-Par Memorial Hall at the School for the Blind, a Tiger Balm charity in Rangoon, Burma

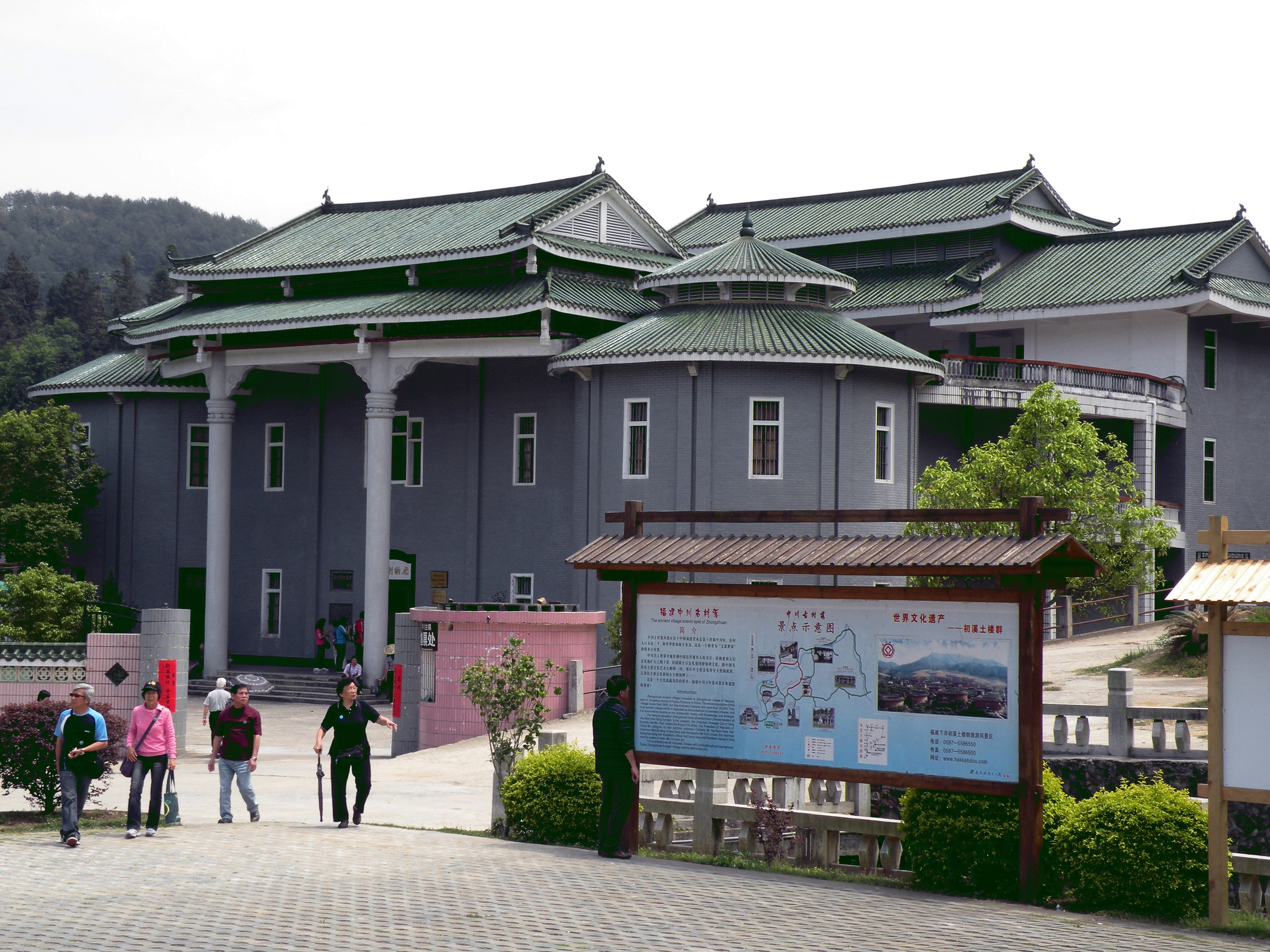
Haw Par Villa in Fujian, unfinished after 1949 and the death of Aw Boon Haw in 1954; finished by his daughter in 1990s

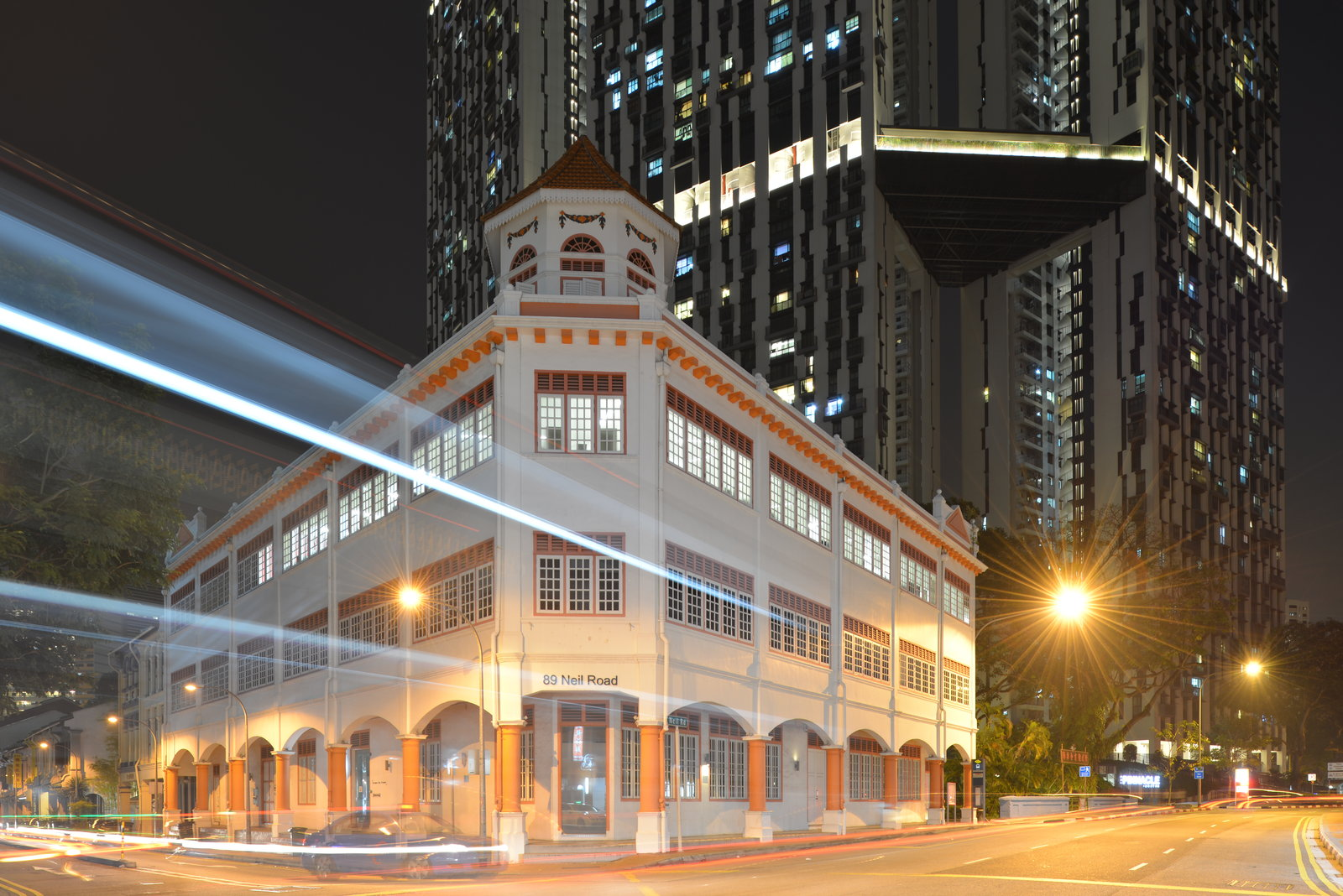
The former Eng Aun Tong Building in Singapore

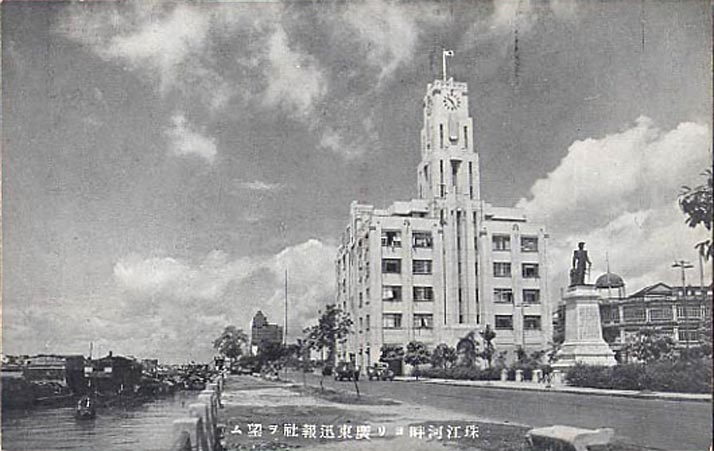
Eng Aun Tong in Guangzhou

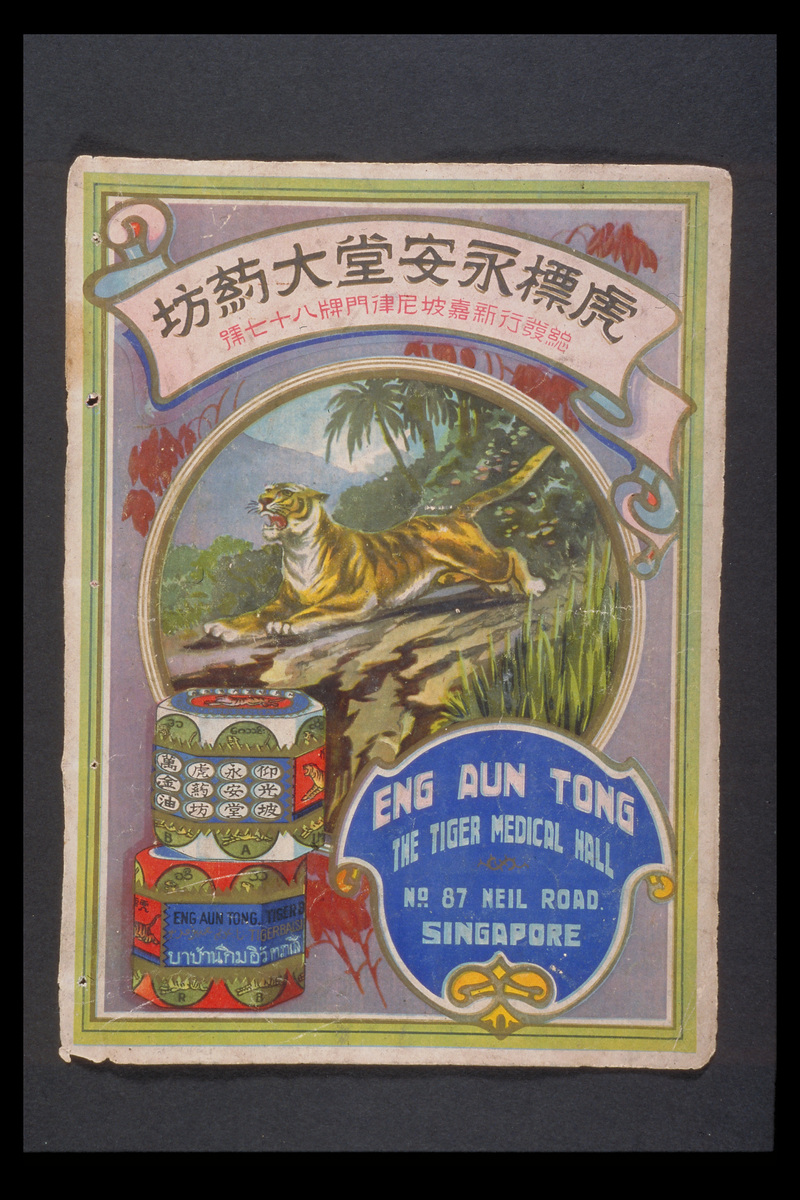
Eng Aun Tong advertisement in 1930s
