= Aw Boon Par =

Burmese Chinese entrepreneur and philanthropist (1888-1944)

- 胡文豹
- Born: 1888; Rangoon, British Burma
- Died: 1944 (aged 55–56); Rangoon, British Burma
- Occupation: entrepreneur
- Board member of: Eng Aun Tong
- Spouses: Piah Lan; Daw Saw; Hong Yin
- Children: Aw Cheng Chye (Son); Aw Cheng Taik (Son); Aw Cheng Sim/Suri Santipongchai (Daughter); Aw Cheng Hu (Daughter)
- Father: Aw Chu Kin
- Relatives: Aw Boon Leng (Eldest Brother); Aw Boon Haw (Second Brother)

Aw Boon Par (Chinese: 胡文豹; pinyin: Hú Wénbào; Pe̍h-ōe-jī: Hô͘ Bûn-pà; 1888–1944) was an entrepreneur and philanthropist best known for introducing Tiger Balm.

He was a son of Hakka herbalist Aw Chu-Kin. Aw was born during the British colonial rule. His father left the business to Boon-Par and after Aw Chu-Kin's death in 1908, he called his elder brother Aw Boon-Haw to run his father's apothecary, Eng Aun Tong ("The Hall of Eternal Peace") together.

Although Aw wished to stay in Yangon, his brother who had settled in Singapore in 1926 convinced him to immigrate, move the family business, and found the precursor of today's Haw Par Corporation. Boon-Haw moved to Hong Kong to manage the business from there, while Boon-Par stayed in Singapore to run the factory. Eventually, Aw closed the factory down, returned to Rangoon, and died there.
