= List of broadsheets =

This list of broadsheets is a list of notable newspapers which are, or were, published in broadsheet format.

== Argentina ==
- La Nación, a national newspaper: Since 31 October 2016, only weekend editions are printed on the traditional broadsheet format.
- Los Andes, Mendoza's newspaper
- La Gaceta, Tucumán's newspaper
- La voz del interior, Córdoba's newspaper

== Australia ==
- The Australian, a national newspaper
- The Age, was historically a broadsheet before becoming a tabloid in 2013.

== Bangladesh ==
Most Bangladeshi daily newspapers are broadsheets.

- The Daily Star, a broadsheet English-language daily
- The Bangladesh Observer, oldest continuously published English-language daily
- Daily Naya Diganta, a broadsheet Bengali-language daily
- The Daily Ittefaq, oldest and most circulated newspaper
- New Age
- The Independent

== Brazil ==
Most Brazilian newspapers are broadsheets, including the three most important:

- O Globo, Rio de Janeiro
- Folha de S.Paulo, São Paulo
- Estado de Minas, Belo Horizonte

== Canada ==
Almost all of Canada's major daily newspapers are broadsheets. Newspapers are in English, unless stated otherwise.

=== National ===
- The Globe and Mail
- The National Post
- Le Devoir (French)

=== Atlantic Canada ===
- The Telegram, St. John's
- The Chronicle-Herald, Halifax
- The Times & Transcript, Moncton
- The Telegraph-Journal, Saint John, New Brunswick
- The Daily Gleaner, Fredericton
- The Charlottetown Guardian
- Cape Breton Post, Sydney, Nova Scotia

=== Quebec ===
- The Gazette, Montreal
- La Presse, Montreal (French)
- Le Devoir, Montreal (French)

=== Ontario ===
- The Hamilton Spectator
- The Kingston Whig-Standard
- The London Free Press
- The Ottawa Citizen
- The Pembroke Daily Observer
- The Peterborough Examiner
- The St. Catharines Standard
- The Sudbury Star
- The Chronicle-Journal
- The Toronto Star
- The Waterloo Region Record, Kitchener-Waterloo and Cambridge
- The Windsor Star

=== Prairies ===
- The Winnipeg Free Press
- The Brandon Sun, Brandon, Manitoba
- The Saskatoon Star-Phoenix
- The Regina Leader Post
- The Edmonton Journal
- The Red Deer Advocate, Red Deer, Alberta
- The Calgary Herald
- The Lethbridge Herald

=== British Columbia ===
- The Vancouver Sun, Vancouver, British Columbia
- The Victoria Times-Colonist, Victoria, British Columbia

== Chile ==
- El Mercurio
- El Sur

== China ==
- China Daily

== Colombia ==
- El Tiempo
- El Espectador (switched to tabloid in 2008)
- El Colombiano (switched to tabloid in 2012)
- El País

== Denmark ==
- Jyllands-Posten (switched to tabloid in 2008)
- Politiken
- Weekendavisen
- Kristeligt Dagblad

== Dominican Republic ==
- Listín Diario
- Hoy
- La Información, Santiago de los Caballeros

== Ecuador ==
Most are broadsheets.

== Finland ==
- Keskisuomalainen
- Maaseudun Tulevaisuus
- Turun Sanomat
- Österbottens Tidning

== France ==
- L'Équipe (formerly)

== Germany ==
Broadsheet is not common. National daily newspapers as Die Zeit, Die Welt, Süddeutsche Zeitung, Frankfurter Allgemeine Zeitung and Bild use Nordisch Format with 570 mm × 400 mm (22 in × 16 in) (1.425 aspect ratio).

== Greece ==
- Kathimerini
- Estia

== Hong Kong ==
- South China Morning Post
- Hong Kong Economic Journal

== Hungary ==
- Magyar Nemzet
- Magyar Hírlap
- Népszava

== India ==
Almost all major newspapers in India are broadsheets. Tabloids are mostly found in small-circulation local or rural papers.

- Law Sapient
- Amar Ujala
- Anandabazar Patrika
- Eenadu
- Aajkaal
- Bartaman
- DNA
- Deccan Chronicle
- Deccan Herald
- Dinamalar
- Dinathanthi
- Dainik Jagran
- Dainik Bhaskar
- Ei Samay
- Ekdin
- Ganashakti
- Hindustan
- Hosa Digantha
- Kannada Prabha
- Lokmat
- Prajavani
- Pudhari
- Sakshi
- Sakal
- Saamana
- Samyuktha Karnataka
- Sangbad Pratidin
- State Times
- Sudharma
- The Financial Express
- The Indian Express
- The Economic Times
- The Hindustan Times
- The Hindu
- The Hitavada
- The New Indian Express
- The Statesman
- The Telegraph
- The Times of India
- Dainik Navajyoti
- Malayala Manorama
- Mathrubhumi
- Varthabharathi
- Imphal Free Press
- Udayavani
- Vijaya Karnataka
- Vijaya Vani
- Vishwavani
- Deepika

== Indonesia ==
- Jawa Pos
- Kompas

== Ireland ==
- Business Post
- Irish Examiner
- Irish Independent (Business, Motors, Property supplements only; the rest switched to tabloid in December 2012, though Sport On Saturday was published as a broadsheet between 29 August 2015 and 23 November 2019)
- The Irish Times
- Sunday Independent

== Israel ==
- Makor Rishon
- Haaretz (1918-February 2007)

== Italy ==
- Avvenire
- Il Foglio
- Il Mattino
- Il Messaggero
- Il Sole 24 Ore
- La Sicilia

== Japan ==
- The Japan Times (English)

Almost all major papers in Japan are Blanket (54.6 cm x 40.65 cm), not Broadsheet.

Below major newspapers are printed on Blanket.

- Asahi Shimbun
- Chunichi Shimbun
- Mainichi Shimbun
- Nihon Keizai Shimbun
- Nikkan Sports
- Sankei Shimbun
- Shimbun Akahata
- Tokyo Sports
- Yomiuri Shimbun

== Lebanon ==
- An-Nahar

== Libya ==
- Libya
- Al Mayadeen

== Malaysia ==
Newspapers such as New Straits Times and Berita Harian used to be published in broadsheet, but were published in the smaller size, instead, from 2005 and 2008, respectively. However, almost all Chinese newspapers in the country continue to publish in broadsheet.

- See Hua Daily News
- The Borneo Post
- China Press
- Nanyang Siang Pau
- Sin Chew Daily
- Kwong Wah Yit Poh
- Overseas Chinese Daily News
- Daily Express
- Guang Ming Daily

== Mauritius ==
- L'Express

== Mexico ==
- El Informador, Guadalajara, Jalisco
- El Universal, Mexico City
- El Norte, Monterrey, Nuevo León

== New Zealand ==
- The New Zealand Herald, Auckland. Only the Saturday edition is broadsheet, the weekday editions switched to compact in September 2012.
- Waikato Times, Hamilton. Only the Saturday edition is broadsheet, the weekday editions switched to compact in April 2018.
- The Dominion Post, Wellington. Only the Saturday edition is broadsheet, the weekday editions switched to compact in April 2018.
- The Press, Christchurch. Only the Saturday edition is broadsheet, the weekday editions switched to compact in April 2018.
- Otago Daily Times, Dunedin
- Taranaki Daily News, New Plymouth. Only the Saturday edition is broadsheet, the weekday editions switched to compact in April 2018.
- The Southland Times, Invercargill. Only the Saturday edition is broadsheet, the weekday editions switched to compact in April 2018.

== Pakistan ==
All Pakistan regional and national newspapers are broadsheets. Pakistan Today is the first and only paper in Berliner format.

- The News International
- Dawn
- Express Tribune
- The Daily Times
- Daily Express
- The Nation

== Panama ==
- La Prensa

Formerly:*La Estrella de Panamá (Tabloid)

== Peru ==
- El Comercio, Lima

== Philippines ==
- Philippine Daily Inquirer
- The Philippine Star
- Manila Bulletin
- Manila Standard
- The Manila Times
- The Daily Tribune
- BusinessWorld
- Business Mirror
- Chinese Commercial News (菲律賓商報)
- Manila Shimbun (日刊まにら新聞)
- United Daily News (聯合日報)
- World News (世界日報)

== Poland ==
All of Poland's quality national dailies (Gazeta Wyborcza, Rzeczpospolita, Nasz Dziennik, and Dziennik Polska-Europa-Świat) are now published in compact format.

== Portugal ==
- Expresso, Lisbon

== Puerto Rico ==
- El Mundo

== Romania ==
- Jurnalul Național, Bucharest

== Russia ==
- Izvestia
- Kommersant
- Russia Beyond the Headlines
- Rossiyskaya Gazeta

== Serbia ==
- Politika

== Singapore ==
- The Straits Times
- Lianhe Zaobao
- Berita Harian (Singapore)

== Sri Lanka ==
- The Sunday Leader

== South Africa ==
- Beeld
- Pretoria News
- The Star
- The Sunday Times
- Die Burger
- The Cape Times

== Spain ==
All newspapers in Spain are printed in compact format.

== Sweden ==
The first major Swedish newspaper to leave the broadsheet format and start printing in tabloid format was Svenska Dagbladet, on 16 November 2000. As of August 2004, 26 newspapers were broadsheets, with a combined circulation of 1,577,700 and 50 newspapers were in a tabloid with a combined circulation of 1,129,400.

On 5 October 2004, the morning newspapers Göteborgs-Posten, Dagens Nyheter, Sydsvenskan, and Östersunds-Posten all switched to tabloid, thus making it the leading format for morning newspapers in Sweden by volume of circulation. Most other broadsheet newspapers have followed since. The last daily Swedish newspaper to switch to tabloid was Jönköpings-Posten, 6 November 2013.

== Thailand ==
Most of the newspapers in Thailand are printed on this format. Notable ones include:

- Bangkok Post
- Daily News (Thai: เดลินิวส์)
- Khaosod (Thai: ข่าวสด)
- Matichon (Thai: มติชน)
- Thairath (Thai: ไทยรัฐ)

== Turkey ==
Most of the newspapers in Turkey are printed on this format. Notable ones include:

- Cumhuriyet
- Sabah
- Hürriyet
- Milliyet
- Posta

== Ukraine ==
- Dzerkalo Tyzhnia

== United Arab Emirates ==
- Khaleej Times
- The National
- Gulf News

== United Kingdom ==
=== UK wide ===
- The Daily Telegraph (The Sunday Telegraph)
- The Financial Times (Monday to Saturday only)
- The Independent
- The Sunday Times
- The Guardian (until 2005, then Berliner, now compact)

=== England ===
- Yorkshire Post

=== Scotland ===
- The Herald
- The Scotsman (until 2004, now compact)

== United States ==
Almost all major papers in the United States are broadsheets.

- Albuquerque Journal
- Boothbay Register/Wiscasset Newspaper
- The Arizona Republic
- Arizona Daily Star
- The Atlanta Journal-Constitution
- The Bakersfield Californian
- The Baltimore Sun
- The Birmingham News
- The Boston Globe
- The Buffalo News
- The Charlotte Observer
- Chattanooga Times Free Press
- Chicago Tribune
- The Courier Journal
- The Dallas Morning News
- The Democrat and Chronicle
- The Denver Post
- Detroit Free Press
- East Bay Times
- The Florida Times-Union
- The Forum of Fargo-Moorhead
- The Fresno Bee
- The Grand Rapids Press
- Houston Chronicle
- The Indianapolis Star
- The Inquirer and Mirror
- The Kansas City Star
- Las Vegas Review-Journal
- Lincoln Journal Star
- Los Angeles Daily News
- Los Angeles Times
- The Mercury News
- The Miami Herald
- Milwaukee Journal Sentinel
- New Hampshire Union Leader
- New York Law Journal
- The New York Times
- The Oklahoman
- Omaha World-Herald
- The Orange County Register
- Orlando Sentinel
- The Philadelphia Inquirer
- Pittsburgh Post-Gazette
- The Plain Dealer
- Portland Press Herald
- Press-Telegram
- The Providence Journal
- The Riverdale Press
- The Sacramento Bee
- The Salt Lake Tribune
- San Antonio Express-News
- The San Bernardino Sun
- San Francisco Chronicle
- Santa Fe New Mexican
- The Seattle Times
- Sonoran News
- Star Tribune
- The Star-Ledger
- The Sun
- Tampa Bay Times
- The Tampa Tribune
- The Times-Picayune
- The Times-Tribune
- The San Diego Union-Tribune
- USA Today
- Vineyard Gazette
- The Wall Street Journal
- The Washington Post
- The Washington Times
- The Wichita Eagle
- The Zephyrhills News

== Vatican City ==
- L'Osservatore Romano
