= Kwong Wah Yit Poh =

Malaysian Chinese daily newspaper

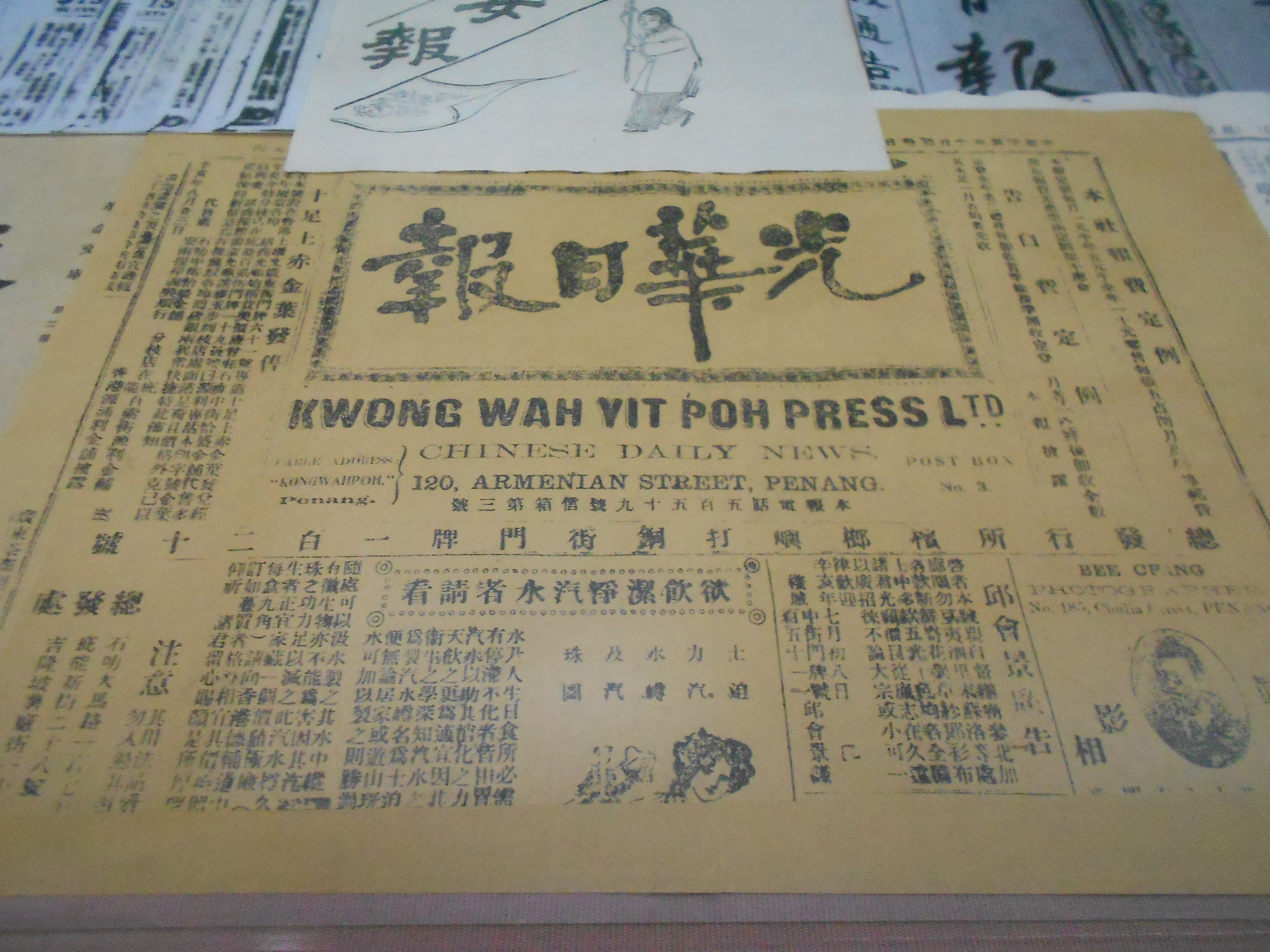
- An old issue of Kwong Wah Yit Poh
- Type: Daily newspaper
- Format: Broadsheet
- Owner: Kwong Wah Yit Poh Press Berhad
- Founder: Sun Yat-sen
- Founded: December 20, 1910; 115 years ago
- Language: Chinese
- Headquarters: 19, Presgrave Street, 10300 Penang, Malaysia
- Circulation: 100,000
- Website: www.kwongwah.com.my

Kwong Wah Yit Poh
- Traditional Chinese: 光華日報
- Simplified Chinese: 光华日报
Transcriptions
Standard Mandarin
- Hanyu Pinyin: Guānghuá Rìbào
- Wade–Giles: Kuang^{1}-hua^{2} Jih^{4}-pao^{4}

Kwong Wah Yit Poh or Kwong Wah Daily (simplified Chinese: 光华日报; traditional Chinese: 光華日報; pinyin: Guānghuá Rìbào; Wade–Giles: Kuang^{1}-hua^{2} Jih^{4}-pao^{4}) is a Malaysian Chinese daily that was founded in 1910 by Chinese revolutionary Sun Yat-sen. It is the oldest surviving Chinese-language newspaper in Southeast Asia.

== History ==
=== Background ===
During the early twentieth century, the Straits Settlements became a centre for political activists and refugees as a result of the struggles between the revolutionary and reformist movements in China. Both movements espoused their causes through their own newspapers, in order to solicit political and financial support from the overseas Chinese in the region. In Penang, to rival the reformist newspaper Penang Sin Poe, which often denounced the revolutionary movement, the Penang branch of Tongmenghui felt necessary to establish its own newspaper.

In 1907, the visitation of revolutionary activists Sun Yat-sen, Hu Hanmin, Huang Xing and Wang Jingwei to Penang had conceived a plan for a publication called Kwang Hwa Pao or 'Glorious Chinese Newspaper'. Ultimately, the plan was aborted when financial backing wavered due to the collapse of tin prices. The Yangon branch of Tongmenghui took up the idea and started Yan Kon Kwang Hwa Pao or Burma Chinese Times. After a short run, the Rangoon paper was banned by the British Burma government due to its radical stance.

=== Establishment ===
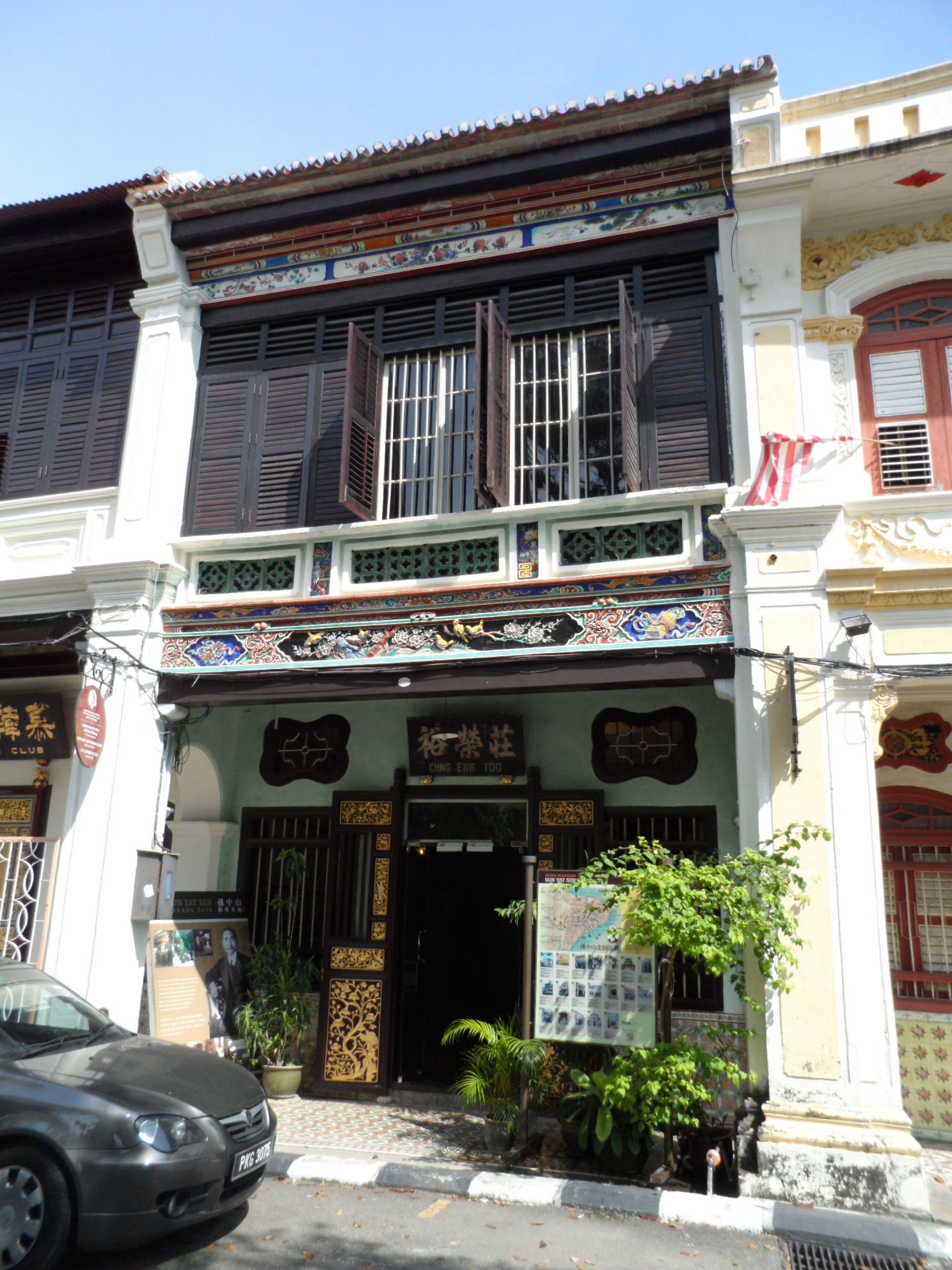
120 Armenian Street

After Yan Kon Kwang Hwa Pao was closed down, the Rangoon Tongmenghui leader Zhuang Yin'an came to Penang along with his machinery to aid Sun's cause and revive his paper.

With Sun Yat-sen's help, a new daily newspaper, Kwong Wah Yit Poh, was launched in Penang. The first issue was published on 2 December 1910, from the headquarters of Tongmenghui's Penang branch at 120 Armenian Street. The building has now been preserved as Sun Yat-sen Museum Penang.

=== Penang Sin Poe Acquirement ===
In 1936, Kwong Wah Yit Poh acquired Penang Sin Poe (established 1895), Penang's first Chinese newspaper. Despite the change in ownership, Penang Sin Poe continued to be published until 30 September 1941.

=== World War II ===
The newspaper had ceased publication in 1941 due to World War II, and its publication did not resume until 1946.

=== Ownership ===
Cheong Yoke Choy who was a keen supporter of the Kuomintang movement had owned shares in the newspaper.

== See also ==
- Other Chinese-language newspapers in Malaysia:
  - Sin Chew Daily
  - Nanyang Siang Pau
  - China Press
  - Guang Ming Daily
  - Oriental Daily News
- Related newspaper:
  - The Star - a newspaper which had once worked together with Kwong Wah Yit Poh before split
- List of newspapers in Malaysia
