= Malaysian Mandarin =

Colloquial Mandarin Chinese in Malaysia

- 马来西亚华语 馬來西亞華語; Mǎláixīyà Huáyǔ
- Region: Malaysia
- Native speakers: 6-7 million
- Language family: Sino-Tibetan: Sinitic; Chinese; Mandarin; Beijing Mandarin; Standard Chinese; Malaysian Mandarin
- Writing system: Simplified Chinese characters (de jure); Traditional Chinese characters

Official status
- Official language in: Malaysia
- Regulated by: Chinese Language Standardisation Council of Malaysia

Language codes
- ISO 639-3: –
- Glottolog: None
- Linguasphere: 79-AAA-bbd-(part)(=colloquial)
- IETF: cmn-MY

Malaysian Mandarin (simplified Chinese: 马来西亚华语; traditional Chinese: 馬來西亞華語; pinyin: Mǎláixīyà Huáyǔ) is a variety of the Chinese language spoken in Malaysia by ethnic Chinese residents. It is currently the primary language used by the Malaysian Chinese community.

Due to the multilingual nature of Malaysian society, Malaysian Mandarin speakers often colloquially code-switch to Malay or English when it comes to local terms or names, even if an official, formal Mandarin term exists. For instance, the formal translation for the street "Jalan Bukit Kepong" is known as "武吉甲洞路" (Wǔjí Jiǎdòng lù; 'Bukit Kepong Road') and is used as such in local Chinese media, but the latter term is rarely used colloquially. Instead, people often use the original Malay name as is. There are exceptions such as Taiping since the name is derived from the Chinese. when people mention the place and speak local Mandarin, they always use its Mandarin pronunciation, "Tàipíng", instead of its Malay pronunciation, which is closer to "Taipeng". Another example is a place's Chinese translation that varies greatly from its native Malay name. For example, Teluk Intan, Seremban, Kota Kinabalu and Bau are preferably referred respectively as Ānsùn (安順) (which refers to "Teluk Anson", Teluk Intan's former colonial name), Fúróng (芙蓉), Yàbì (亞庇) and Shilongmen (石隆門).

== Terminology ==
While 华语 sometimes refers to all languages and varieties spoken by Chinese people including Cantonese and Hokkien, it is the common name for Mandarin in overseas Chinese communities like those in Malaysia and Singapore. In Malaysia, the terms 华语 and 华文 are preferred, being used in daily speech and in school curriculums, instead of the terms 普通话, 中文, 汉语, or 国语 used in China and Taiwan (In Malaysia, 国语 / 国文 refers to the national language Malay). The term 唐人话 may be used by some (mainly older) speakers in Malaysia.

== Phonology and Tones ==
Edmund Yeo speaking Mandarin with a Malaysian accent

The phonology of Malaysian Mandarin is more closely aligned with the Mandarin accents of Southern China than with the Beijing standard pronunciation, such as a lack of erhua. That is a consequence of the influence of other Sinitic varieties, including Cantonese and Hokkien.

In comparison with Standard Chinese, Taiwanese and Singaporean Mandarin, Malaysian Mandarin is characterised by a relatively tonally 'flat' sound, as well as an extensive use of glottal stops and the "checked tone". That results in a distinct "clipped" sound compared to other forms of Mandarin.

- The phonemes "j", "x", and "h" (as in 级 ji, 西 xi, and 汉 han) tend to be pronounced as /t͡s/, /s/, and /h/ repectively (rather than /t͡ɕ/, /ɕ/, and /x/) – also influenced by absence of alveopalatals in Malay phonology.
- The retroflex consonants "zh", "sh", and "ch" (as in 之 zhi, 师 shi, and 吃 chi) tend not to be retroflex, instead sounding the same as "z", "s", and "c" (/t͡s/, /s/, /t͡sʰ/ rather than /ʈ͡ʂʰ/, /ʂ/, /ʈ͡ʂ/)
- the "er" phoneme (as in 儿 or 二) is usually pronounced as /ə/ (instead of /ɚ/)
- the "i" phoneme (as in 吃, 十, or 日) is usually pronounced as /ɨ~ə/ (instead of /ɹ̩~ɻ̩/)
- the "r" phoneme (as in 然) is usually pronounced as /ɹ/ (similar to English, instead of /ʐ/)
- the "-in" ending (as in 金, 新, or 宾) may be blurred with the "-ing" ending in daily speech.

=== The Fifth Tone ===
Among some speakers of Malaysian Mandarin, some words originally pronounced with Tone 1 (Flat tone), Tone 2 (Rising tone), and Tone 3 (Low tone) in Standard Mandarin are sometimes pronounced with a falling pitch.

逼 (bī) -> (bì)

鼻 (bí) -> (bì)

笔 (bǐ) -> (bì)

This "Fifth" tone is, according to research, barely distinguishable from Tone 4 (the Falling tone), although there have been some observed differences:

- It is shorter and more tense than Tone 4,
- It starts slightly higher and falls earlier than Tone 4,
- It is usually accompanied by a glottal stop or a large amount of glottalization.

This phenomenon seems to typically affect words that end with a stop consonant (-p -t -k) when read in the Southern Chinese varieties present in Malaysia, including Cantonese, Hakka, and Hokkien. For example, "逼" is read as "bik1" in Cantonese, "pit" in Hakka, and "pek" in Hokkien. Although, it is unclear why a few words that don't have this property (e.g. "鼻") can be affected too by this phenomenon.

=== Tones ===
==== Third Tone Sandhi ====
In Standard Mandarin, when there are consecutive 2 third tones, the first one changes to second tone. This is called third tone sandhi, for example 管理 (guǎn + lǐ) becoming guán lǐ. Most Malaysian Mandarin speakers do follow this rule, but there are some cases in which some do not.

When 2 third tones are within a word (e.g., 老虎, 可以), the rule is followed. However, some Malaysian Mandarin speakers do not follow this rule across word boundaries, sometimes even having 3 or more third tones in a row. Examples: 你拿起来啦 nǐ nǎ qǐ lái lā, 哪里有几多个 nà lǐ yǒu jǐ duō gè.

A study which had participants read a nursery rhyme found that third tone sandhi can be affected by syntactic and rhythmic relations, as well as whether or not the 2 characters with third tones are in a foot (a rhythmic unit).

==== Lack of neutral tones ====
There is a lack of a neutral tone (轻声) in some Malaysian Mandarin speakers, hence each character is pronounced with its original, full lexical tone. This is very obviously seen with the suffix 子 in words such as 桌子, 鼻子, and 日子, as it is pronounced with a neutral tone in Standard Mandarin, but with a third tone in Malaysian Mandarin. This could even trigger third tone sandhi, for example 椅子 (yǐ + zǐ) is read "yǐ zi" in Standard Mandarin but "yí zǐ" in Malaysian Mandarin.

== Demographics ==
As of 2014, 93% of ethnic Chinese families in Malaysia speak varieties of Chinese, which includes Mandarin.

== Early Ming and Qing immigrants ==
The majority of ethnic Chinese people living in Malaysia came from China during the Ming and Qing dynasties, between the 15th and early 20th centuries. Earlier immigrants married Malays and assimilated to a larger extent than later waves of migrants and form a distinct sub-ethnic group, known as the Peranakans, and their descendants speak Malay.

The majority of immigrants were speakers of Hokkien (Min Nan), Cantonese, Hakka, Teochew, and Hainanese. In the 19th century, Qing immigrants to Malaya had no single common language and were mostly uneducated peasants. They tended to cluster themselves according to the ethno-linguistic group, usually corresponding to their place of origin, and worked with relatives and other speakers of the same language. In 1879, according to Isabella Bird, a visitor to the tin mining boomtown of Taiping, Perak, "five topolects of Chinese are spoken, and Chinamen constantly communicate with each other in Malay, because they can't understand each other's Chinese".

The Chinese languages spoken in Malaysia have over the years become localized (e.g. Penang Hokkien), as is apparent from the use of Malay and English loan words. Words from other Chinese languages are also injected, depending on the educational and cultural background of the speaker. Mandarin in Malaysia has also been localized as a result of the influence of other Chinese variants spoken in Malaysia, rather than of Malay. Loan words were discouraged in Mandarin instructions at local Chinese school and regarded as mispronunciations.

== Writing System ==
Malaysia is often said to be only using simplified Chinese characters after its adoption in the 1980s, whereas traditional Chinese characters are said to be only used in Taiwan, Hong Kong, and Macau. Students are taught to read and write only simplified characters in most Malaysian Chinese schools, except for a few private ones. Regarding the romanization of these Chinese characters, pinyin is taught in most schools in Malaysia, instead of bopomofo mainly taught in Taiwan.

Nonetheless, traditional Chinese characters are still prevalent in Malaysia, seen on signage, menus, and in non-educational reading materials. Names of buildings, shops, and restaurants are sometimes also in traditional characters. Ironically, some Chinese schools display their names in traditional characters although only simplified characters are taught inside.

Of course, Malaysian Chinese who learned Mandarin before the '80s mainly use traditional characters. However, many younger Malaysian Chinese do also use them. Though, most of them can only read and type them out but cannot write them by hand. The popularity of media (e.g. news, movies, books) from Hong Kong and Taiwan may have played a role in influencing the usage of traditional characters.

Some Chinese newspapers use both simplified and traditional characters, with traditional characters for large text like headlines or sub-headings, and simplified characters for the content. Examples include Sin Chew Daily, Guang Ming Daily, and China Press.

== Code-mixing ==
Some Malaysian speakers regularly mix different languages together, including English, Malay, Mandarin, as well as other Chinese varieties like Cantonese and Hokkien. This is called code-mixing, sometimes referred to by Malaysians as Bahasa Rojak (Rojak Language). This often occurs in Malaysian Mandarin, both in casual and formal situations. It may happen when they are not very proficient in Mandarin, want to more clearly convey their message, or want to include and exclude people in a conversation, among other reasons.

== Vocabulary ==
=== Loanwords ===
Although Chinese is known for its few transliterated loanwords, as shown by them making up less than 2% of the language. However, Malaysian Mandarin has many transliterations (and calques) from Malay for the local food, titles, clothing, etc. Many of these words have a lot of variations as they don't have standardised spellings. Examples below are non-exhaustive.

Loanwords from Malay
Malaysian Mandarin Word	Original word
Food
峇拉煎 / 马来栈	Belacan
咖椰 / 咖央	Kaya
煎蕊	Cendol
叻沙 / 啦沙	Laksa
罗惹 / 罗杂	Rojak
爪哇面	Mee Jawa
嚤嚤喳喳	Bubur Cha-Cha
沙爹	Sate
Titles
拿督	Datuk
拿督斯里	Dato Sri
丹斯里	Tan Sri
敦	Tun
东姑	Tunku
Other
峇迪	Batik
卡巴亚 / 卡峇雅	Kebaya
纱笼	Sarong
令吉	Ringgit
嘛嘛档	Gerai Mamak
亚答	Atap
班顿	Pantun
娘惹	Nyonya

Some standard Mandarin words may even be replaced by Malay and English loanwords. These words don't just show up in daily speech, but also may be on signboards, menus, and newspapers, instead of standard Mandarin equivalents.

Loanwords which may replace standard Mandarin ones
Malaysian Mandarin Word	Standard Mandarin Word	Original Word
From Malay
苏东	鱿鱼	Sotong
罗地	面包	Roti
多隆	帮忙	Tolong
马打	警察	Mata-mata
甘榜	村庄	Kampung
巴刹	菜市场	Pasar
煎不辣	小波罗蜜	Cempedak
花園	住宅区	Taman
吃风	旅游	(Calque) Makan Angin
咖啡錢	贿赂	(Calque) Duit Kopi
From English
仙	分	Cent
安哥	叔叔	Uncle
安娣	阿姨	Aunty
巴仙	百分比	Percent
芝士	奶酪	Cheese
罗里	卡车	Lorry
巴士	公共汽车	Bus
德士 / 得士	出租車	Taxi

Some standard Mandarin words may be replaced by direct borrowings from other Chinese varieties such as Cantonese, Hokkien, Hakka. If these words already exist in standard Mandarin with a different meaning (e.g, 咖啡店, 花園, 凉粉), both the original and borrowed meanings can be used.

Direct Borrowing from Other Chinese Varieties
Malaysian Mandarin Word	Standard Mandarin Word	From
大耳窿	放高利贷者	Cantonese
云吞	馄饨	Cantonese
凉粉	仙草冻	Cantonese
放飛機	放鴿子	Cantonese
孤寒	吝啬	Cantonese
辣椒仔	小辣椒	Cantonese
顶不顺	受不了	Cantonese
户口	账户	Cantonese
分分钟	随时	Cantonese
猪手	猪脚	Cantonese
公司	分享	Hokkien
咖啡乌, 茶乌	黑咖啡, 无奶红茶	Hokkien
咖啡冰, 茶冰	冰咖啡, 冰茶	Hokkien
啦啦	蛤蜊	Hokkien

=== Word Choice ===
Many words used are slightly different than standard Mandarin, with a majority being influenced by other (mostly Southern) Chinese varieties. Hence, the vocabulary used is often the same as those used by speakers in Southern China, Taiwan, and Hong Kong.

Most Malaysian Mandarin speakers use a combination of both Malaysian and Standard Mandarin words, varying drastically depending on where they are from, education, and many other factors.

Words different from Standard Mandarin
Malaysian Mandarin	Standard Mandarin
Nouns
底裤	内裤
戏院	电影院
回教堂	清真寺
冲凉房	浴室
爹哋	爸爸
电单车 / 摩哆车	摩托车
脚车	自行车
救伤车	救护车
冰橱 / 雪柜	冰箱
冷气	空调
吸尘机	吸尘器
滑鼠	鼠标
拜一, … , 拜六, 礼拜	星期一, … , 星期六, 星期日
打包	外帶
快熟麵	方便麵
生果	水果
黄梨	菠萝
水蓊	蓮霧
水	饮料
滚水	开水
烧水	热水
唐茶	红茶 / 中国茶
四角豆	四棱豆
江鱼仔	凤尾鱼
报生纸	出生证
屠妖节	排灯节
机率	几率
水草	吸管
得空, 不得空	有空, 没空
散錢	零錢
组屋	公用住房
外婆, 外公	外祖母, 外祖父
笔芯笔	自动铅笔
纸袋	塑料袋
青色	绿色
飞机师	飞行员
十千	万
邮差	邮递员
万字	彩票
树胶带	橡皮筋
七早八早	大清早
胶擦	橡皮
锁匙	钥匙
扫把	扫帚
计算机	计算器
Verbs
漏风	受潮
懂	知道
冲凉	洗澡
踏脚车	骑自行车
割车	超车
买单	结账
打油	加油
打战	打仗
按钱 / 拿钱	提款
发梦	做梦
Other
做么	为什么
好彩	幸好
够力	严重
几多	多少

=== Abbreviations for Schools ===
Abbreviation	Stands for
华校	华文学校
华小	华文小学
华中	华文中学
国小	国民小学
国中	国民中学
淡小	淡米尔小学

=== Unique Phrases ===
- 跳飞机 - to work abroad illegally
- 香蕉人 - Chinese person who can't speak Chinese (usually only speaks English)
- 乱水 - chaotic
- 摆美 - useless, purely for decoration
- 友族 - friends from another race

== Counting ==
=== Time ===
When reading the time, 点 (o'clock) is used instead of 时, and 个字 (5 minutes, representing the numbers on a clock) is used instead of 分. 个字 can also be omitted. Hours (duration) are counted with ~个钟头 or ~粒种 (from Cantonese) instead of ~个小时.

- 6:45 - 六点九个字 / 六点九
- 2 hours - 两个钟头 / 两粒钟

== See also ==
- Standard Mandarin
- Taiwanese Mandarin
- Philippine Mandarin
- Regional differences in the Chinese language
