= Nanyang Sinchew =

Nanyang Sinchew may refer to:

- Nanyang Sinchew Lianhe Zaobao, Singapore morning newspaper
- Nanyang Sinchew Lianhe Wanbao, Singapore evening newspaper
