= Sin Chew Jit Poh =

Sin Chew Jit Poh may refer to one of the two newspaper:

- Sin Chew Jit Poh (Singapore) defunct Singapore newspaper, published from 1929 to 1983, which the Malaysian version was split from
- Sin Chew Daily, Malaysian newspaper, split from Singapore version in 1960s (by ownership in 1975)
