= Chinese Language Standardisation Council of Malaysia =

The Chinese Language Standardisation Council of Malaysia (Note: Although Malaysian English generally prefers -ise, Yufan's official site is ambiguous between -ise and -ize in its name.) (simplified Chinese: 马来西亚华语规范理事会; traditional Chinese: 馬來西亞華語規範理事會; pinyin: Mǎláixīyà Huáyǔ Guīfàn Lǐshìhuì; Malay: Majlis Pembakuan Bahasa Cina Malaysia), abbreviated Yufan (Chinese: 语范; pinyin: Yǔfàn) is the body charged with regulating the use of the Chinese language in Malaysia under Ministry of Education (Malaysia) (In this case, the Chinese language is referred to as the Malaysian Mandarin Chinese language.)

== Background ==
Malaysia is home to approximately 7.2 million ethnic Chinese (23% of the population). The use of the Chinese language is preserved through Chinese vernacular education. Many varieties of Chinese are also used.

Malaysian Chinese have the option of sending their children to vernacular public schools which use Chinese as the medium of instruction at the primary level. At secondary level, some students opt for Chinese Independent High Schools, instead of national public schools, which use Malay (officially referred to as the Malaysian language (Bahasa Malaysia)) as the medium of instruction. It is also widely taught as a third language alongside English and Mandarin in English Medium international schools.

Malaysia also has a robust Chinese-language media. The Sin Chew Daily is the highest-circulated daily newspaper of any language in Malaysia. News telecasts read in Chinese (Malaysian Mandarin) are broadcast by state television stations TV2 and Bernama TV, and private stations such as ntv7 and 8TV.

The simplified Chinese script is used officially in Malaysia, however Traditional Chinese scripts see widespread daily usage too especially in online media.

== History ==
In 1997, Malaysia hosted the Seminar on Chinese Language Teaching in Southeast Asia, after which scholars in Malaysia agreed to form the Chinese Language Standardisation Working Committee (Chinese: 马来西亚华语规范工委会), which was the predecessor to Yufan. The Working Committee consisted of representatives from civil society organisations. It was dissolved in 2003.

In order to standardise the use of Chinese by the Chinese media in Malaysia, the Ministry of Information formed the Standardisation Council on 12 February 2004. The Council is later transferred to the Ministry of Education Malaysia in 2006.

== Role ==
The Council's stated mission is to "encourage the use of standard Mandarin Chinese, including translated names, phonetics, grammar, words and text, without discouraging the use of Chinese dialects". It consists of six divisions, each in charge of specific areas: translation, information, phonetics, grammar, vocabulary and writing, and publishing.

=== Membership ===
Members of the Council consist of representatives from the Ministry of Education, the Association of Translation and Creative Writing, the Federation of Chinese Associations (Huazhong), the private Chinese education sector, the Home Ministry, Chinese newspapers, Chinese radio stations and public universities.

=== Chair ===
The following is the list of chairpeople of the Standardisation Council since 2004:

1. Donald Lim Siang Chai, as Deputy Information Minister (2004–2006)
2. Hon Choon Kim, as Deputy Education Minister (2006–2009)
3. Wee Ka Siong, as Deputy Education Minister and Minister in the Prime Minister's Department (2008–2013)
4. Chong Sin Woon, as Deputy Education Minister (2015-2018)
5. Teo Nie Ching, as Deputy Education Minister (2018–present)

== See also ==
- Malaysian Mandarin
- Standard Singaporean Mandarin
