= Manoj Shroff =

Indian businessman

Manoj Shashichandra Shroff (born 4 January 1964) is an Indian business industrialist, founder, and chairman of Niti Group, a private conglomerate well established in the IT, furniture, hospitality, beverage, and pharmaceutical industries.

== Awards and recognitions ==
- Entrepreneur Magazine Middle East has awarded Manoj Shroff "International Expansion of the Year Award 2019" for the expansion of his conglomerate companies known as Niti Group.
- Asiaone has awarded Manoj Shroff in World's Greatest Brands & Leaders Asia and GCC as Great Leader of the Year, 2018-2019.
- Asiaone Magazine has recognized Manoj Shroff as Person of the Year, 2017-2018.
- Forbes Middle East Top Indian Businessman in the Middle East.
- SME Awards
