= Ugandan booby trap =

Series of crimes in Uganda

Ugandan booby trap is the name given to a group of crimes first reported in late 2008 in Uganda.

The victims were discovered by police to have been found stripped naked, with all their possessions taken. When discovered, they were not able to remember anything about the circumstances which led to their being in that position, other than "being in the act of romancing", elsewhere described as "intimate activity", with an attractive, busty lady that had met earlier at a bar.

A spokesman for Uganda's Criminal Investigations Directorate, Fred Enanga, found that the women involved had smeared their chests with chloroform, and several other types of strong sedatives, Enanga also stated that he first became aware of the situation after a known thief, Juliana Mukasa, whom Enanga described as a "very dangerous lady", "made a clean breast of the matter".

Enanga warned all men to be on the warned of this danger, particularly travelling businessmen who tend to carry more cash. He reported that while they did not know how they were acquiring the sedatives, they were looking for the source. He also reported that the group's early investigations indicated that the gang involved may have had dozens of members, although it was not known whether they were all female.

The story attracted substantial international attention at the time, with it being reported in such locations as The Daily Telegraph, The Huffington Post, AsiaOne, and the National Public Radio program Wait Wait... Don't Tell Me!.
