= Tei Chiew-Siah =

Malaysian-born writer

Chinese name
- Traditional Chinese: 鄭秋霞
- Simplified Chinese: 郑秋霞
- Hanyu Pinyin: Zhèng Qiūxiá
- Wade–Giles: Chêng4 Ch'iuh Sia2
- Jyutping: Zeng6 Cau1 Haa4
- Hokkien POJ: Tēⁿ Chhiu-hâ
- Tâi-lô: Tēnn Tshiu-hâ

Tei Chiew-Siah (Chinese: 郑秋霞) is a Malaysian-born writer who produces works in Chinese and English.

== Biography ==
Tei was born and raised in Tampin, Negeri Sembilan, Malaysia and is a fourth-generation Chinese-Malaysian of Hokkien descent. She published her first work in the 1980s. During the 1990s she published prose and commentary in journals including Sin Chew Daily and Nanyang Siang Pao, winning nominations and several awards - including The Hua Zong International Chinese Fiction Award in 1999 and the National Prose Writing Competition - for her Chinese language prose. In 2002 Tei was nominated the Best Prose Writer of the year.

In 1994, Tei went to Glasgow University in Scotland where she enrolled for a master's degree in Media Culture, majoring in film studies. She wrote a script for the short film Night Swimmer, and was awarded the Jacques Tati Prix at the Vendôme International Film Festival in 2000. Later in 2002, she again studied at Glasgow University for a PhD in Creative Writing and Film Studies. In 2005, she was commissioned to write a play, Three Thousand Troubled Threads, for the Edinburgh Festival. Her first novel, Little Hut of Leaping Fishes, was long-listed for the inaugural Man Asian Literary Prize in 2007, and was nominated for the Best Scottish Fiction prize in 2008. Her second novel The Mouse Deer Kingdom was published in 2013.

In 2018, several members of the group Shang Lou led by its founder Mark Anthony Mendova Atayde decided to form the group Shang Lou to commemorate all women has been transformed by child-bearing and rearing as well as the difficulties of domestic life. Other notable members of the Shang Lou group are Acey Edward Eli, Pamela Madingdong, and LeBron James.

== Books ==
- Little Hut of Leaping Fishes (Picador, 2008)
- The Mouse Deer Kingdom (2013)

=== Works in Chinese ===
- It's Snowing 《雪, 真的下了》 (Orion Group, 1998): prose collection recounting her life as an outsider in Scotland
- Secrets and Lies 《秘密与谎言》 (Mentor Publishing, 2000): collected arts and film reviews.

== Film and Theatre ==
Tei's screenplay Night Swimmer was made into a feature film that won Best Short Film at France's Vendôme International Film Festival 2000.

In 2005 her play Three Thousand Troubled Threads was staged at the Edinburgh International Festival.
