= Oriental Daily News (Malaysia) =

Chinese language newspaper in Malaysia

- Type: Daily newspaper
- Format: Broadsheet
- Owner: KTS Group
- Founded: 2002; 24 years ago
- Language: Chinese
- Website: www.orientaldaily.com.my

Oriental Daily News (simplified Chinese: 东方日报; traditional Chinese: 東方日報) is one of Malaysia's daily Chinese-language newspapers, published in broadsheet format. It was officially launched on New Year's Day 2003. The newspaper group is owned by KTS Group, a Sarawak timber company founded by late Datuk Lau Hui Kang.

The newspaper actually published its first issue on 29 September 2002, but its publication's permit was suspended by the Malaysian Home Ministry. The suspension was subsequently lifted in December 2002. It was reported a large numbers of journalists from the Nanyang Press and China Press left to join this newspaper group.

In 2014, Oriental Daily News was endorsed by the Malaysian branch of FIACBI as the official Chinese newspaper for the Malaysia Property Awards.
