= Yazhou Zhoukan =

Hong Kong magazine

- Traditional Chinese: 亞洲週刊
- Simplified Chinese: 亚洲周刊
Transcriptions
Standard Mandarin
- Hanyu Pinyin: Yàzhōu Zhōukān
Yue: Cantonese
- Jyutping: aa3 zau1 zau1 hon1*2

Yazhou Zhoukan (Chinese: 亞洲週刊; lit. 'Asia Weekly') is a Chinese-language international affairs newsweekly. It was launched in 1987 by Michael O'Neill as a sister magazine to Asiaweek. It is published by Yazhou Zhoukan Limited (a subsidiary of Media Chinese International Limited), and provides international political, economic and cultural news. In December 2011, its circulation reached 150,000.

== History ==
1975–1987

Asiaweek was founded in 1975 by Michael O'Neill, a New Zealander, and T. J. S. George, an Indian, who had worked together at the Far Eastern Economic Review. O'Niell's experience in Asia confirms his belief that "the Asian century is coming".

In 1985, Time, Inc. (as it was then known) acquired 84% of Asiaweek, buying out Reader's Digest's 80% stake and 4% local interests. The remaining 16% was owned by Michael O'Neill.

The Chinese edition of Asiaweek, Yazhou Zhoukan, was launched in 1987 as a sister magazine to Asiaweek. O'Neill was a founding Editor-in-Chief of Yazhou Zhoukan, with Thomas Hon Wing Polin as its founding Managing Editor.

1987–1994

During the late 1980s, the People's Republic of China introduced the reform and opening-up policy; the negotiation between the British and Chinese governments over Hong Kong was drawing to a close; and the Chinese diaspora in Southeast Asia was coming out of discrimination and oppression. Under this context, Michael O'Neill founded the Chinese edition of Asiaweek, Yazhou Zhoukan, to attract readers from the Chinese community across Asia.

Yazhou Zhoukan was branded as "the first Chinese language international affairs newsweekly"; "the first Chinese newsweekly to report from around the globe"; and "the best medium to keep up to date with the global Chinese diaspora". It published its first issue in December 1987.

In 1991, Yazhou Zhoukan switched to computer typesetting.

1994–Present

In 1994, Time Warner Inc. sold the magazine to Ming Pao Enterprise Corporation Limited. Currently, Yazhou Zhoukan is published by Yahzhou Zhoukan Limited, a subsidiary of Media Chinese International Limited, which is the parent company of Ming Pao Enterprise Corporation.

In 1998, Yazhou Zhoukan, launched its own website.

In March 2001, TOM.COM purchased 50% of shares of Yazhou Zhoukan.

Yazhou Zhoukan reports the Chinese perspectives of international issues from political, economic and cultural aspects. It features regular contributors and journalists from around the world, including Hong Kong, Macao, mainland China, Taiwan, Japan, South Korea, Thailand, Russia, United Kingdom, United States, Canada, France, Germany, Australia, Malaysia and Indonesia

== Readership ==
Readers of Yazhou Zhoukan are mainly in Hong Kong, mainland China, Taiwan, Malaysia, Singapore, Philippines, Japan, South Korea, Canada, United Kingdom, United States etc. According to a survey by Yazhou Zhoukan, 50% of readers belong to the middle class with relatively high incomes and educational level. Most of them are senior management personnel and entrepreneurs.

Yazhou Zhoukan is selected as in-flight magazine for Cathay Pacific, Malaysia Airlines, Singapore Airlines, United Airlines, China Airlines and Thai Airways.

According to the Hong Kong Audit Bureau of Circulations, circulation of Yazhou Zhoukan was 73,000 in 2006. 34,000 of those were sold in Hong Kong and 39,000 were sold outside Hong Kong. In October 2011, circulation reached 150,000.

== Young Chinese Entrepreneur Award ==
In 2002, the 15th Anniversary of Yazhou Zhoukan, it organised its first Young Chinese Entrepreneur Award. It aims to encourage young entrepreneurs to excel in their fields to create a good prospect for the Asian economic climate.

This award is open to individuals from five regions, including mainland China, Hong Kong, Taiwan, Singapore and Malaysia. Only one winner is selected from each of the five important Asian regions. The winners of the Young Chinese Entrepreneur Awards are mainly CEOs or group managing directors of the companies.

== Achievements ==
In 2002, Yazhou Zhoukan was selected as the most popular Chinese magazine among Asian financiers and executives.

In March 2003, its photographer, Kwong Wingkeung, won the Focus at the Frontline 2002, organised by the Hong Kong Press Photographers Association in the Photo Essay Category for his work, Afghan- being neglected because of her peace. Three months later, the story Exclusive Report: Liu Xiaoqing, the Movie Star of the Mainland China, was Imprisoned won the 2003 SOPA Editorial Excellence Award for Excellence in Reporting, Chinese Language Category. Other awards include:

The Society of Publishers in Asia Awards 2006: Excellence in Human Rights Report – Honorable Mention (中國維權人士律師，法治先鋒); Excellence in Feature Writing – Award (快樂的是是菲律賓人超越政經痛苦); Excellence in Opinion Writing – Honorable Mention (美越為越戰翻案)

The Society of Publishers in Asia Awards 2007: Excellence in Feature Writing – Honorable Mention (中國維權新浪潮，中產階段新博奕); Excellence in Magazine Front Cover Design – Honorable Mention (以色列中國民工賭命); Excellence in Opinion Writing – Award (程翔系列)

The Society of Publishers in Asia Awards 2008: Excellence in Human Rights Report – Award (揭開現代中國奴工產業鏈真相); Excellence in Reporting on the Environment – Award (環境危機催生中國新民主運動); The Scoop Award – Honorable Mention (西藏談判僵局，達賴特使密晤京官內情)
