= Nanyang Siang Pau =

Malaysian newspaper

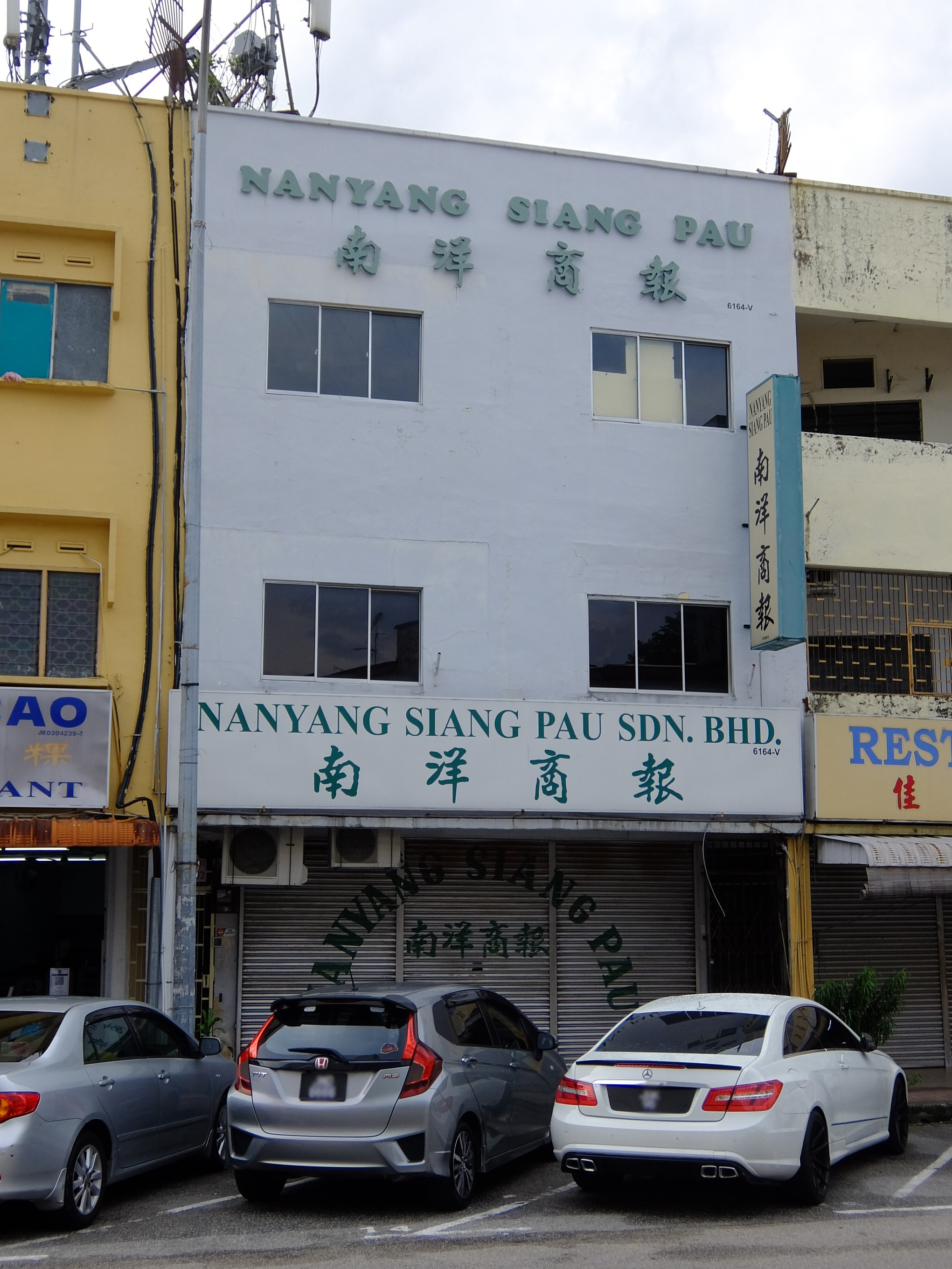
- Nanyang Siang Pau branch office in Johor Bahru, Johor
- Native name: 南洋商報; Nányáng Shāngbào
- Type: Daily newspaper
- Format: Broadsheet
- Owner: Nanyang Press
- Founded: 6 September 1923; 102 years ago in Straits Settlements
- Language: Mandarin
- Headquarters: Petaling Jaya, Selangor, Malaysia
- Circulation: 114,000 (2012)
- Sister newspapers: China Press
- Website: www.enanyang.my

Nanyang Siang Pau
- Traditional Chinese: 南洋商報
- Simplified Chinese: 南洋商报
Transcriptions
Standard Mandarin
- Hanyu Pinyin: Nányáng Shāngbào
- Wade–Giles: Nan^{2}-yang^{2} Shang^{1}-pao^{4}

Nanyang Siang Pau or Nanyang Business Daily (Note: (simplified Chinese: 南洋商报; traditional Chinese: 南洋商報; pinyin: Nányáng Shāngbào; Wade–Giles: Nan^{2}-yang^{2} Shang^{1}-pao^{4})) is a Malaysian Chinese daily newspaper. Originally founded in Singapore on 6 September 1923 by philanthropist-entrepreneur Tan Kah Kee, its original newspaper circulated across the Straits Settlements. It is the oldest Chinese-language newspaper in Malaysia behind Kwong Wah Yit Poh.

It has been published continuously aside from four months between 1923 and 1924, and during World War II from 1942 until resuming publication on 8 September 1945.

== History ==
The original Nanyang Siang Pau was founded by Tan Kah Kee in the Straits Settlements on 6 September 1923.

During the Japanese invasion of Manchuria in 1931, Nanyang Siang Pau started Sunday publications from 20 December 1931 to report on the war. The special edition was later named the "Sunday Edition".

The newspaper first ventured into Kuala Lumpur in 1958, but the newspaper remains printed in Singapore. In 1962, the headquarters of Nanyang Siang Pau moved to Kuala Lumpur, first with Jalan Travers, Brickfields, and followed by Jalan Bangsar in 1972.

The Singapore edition of the paper has merged with Sin Chew Jit Poh on March 16, 1983, to form the current Lianhe Zaobao.

In August 1932, the Nanyang Daily was separated from Tan's company. The newspaper company name was changed to Nanyang Press in 1975. In 1993, Nanyang Press took over the management of another Chinese daily, China Press and a year later, its office moved to Section 7, Petaling Jaya, its current location.

Nanyang had its initial public offering (IPO) in 1989, the first Chinese daily to be listed in Bursa Malaysia. Until the late 1980s, it was Malaysia's highest-selling Chinese newspaper, before being overtaken by Sin Chew Daily, which is also the highest-selling Chinese newspaper outside of Hong Kong, mainland China, and Taiwan.

On 28 May 2001, Huaren Holdings, the investment arm of the political party MCA, bought over Nanyang Press, in a controversial transaction that led to mass boycotts of the newspaper by the Chinese community.

By June 2005, Nanyang has raised more than RM240 million for Chinese education in Malaysia, through its Top Ten charity concerts in conjunction with Carlsberg Malaysia.

in 2006, Huaren Holdings disposed 21.02% of its share to Ezywood Options Sdn Bhd, a company owned by Tan Sri Tiong Hiew King. Huaren's remaining stake were exchanged for a share in Media Chinese International Ltd (MCIL) in 2008, but then disposed of its entire holding in MCIL in 2010.

== See also ==
- Other Chinese language newspapers in Malaysia:
  - China Press, its sister publication
  - Guang Ming Daily, its sister publication
  - Sin Chew Daily, its sister publication
  - Kwong Wah Yit Poh
  - Oriental Daily News
- Related newspaper
  - Nanyang Siang Pau, former original Singaporean edition and sister publication, merged with the Singaporean edition of Sin Chew Jit Poh to form Lianhe Zaobao in 1983
