= The Business Times (Singapore) =

Financial newspaper

- Type: Daily newspaper
- Format: Print, online
- Owner: SPH Media
- Editor: Chen Huifen
- Founded: 1 October 1976; 50 years ago (18,310 issues)
- Political alignment: Pro-business
- Language: English
- OCLC number: 464696647
- Website: businesstimes.com.sg

The Business Times is a Singaporean financial newspaper under SPH Media, a media organisation with businesses in print, digital, radio, and outdoor media in Singapore. The paper is published Monday to Saturday, with the Saturday edition called The Business Times Weekend. It had a circulation (print and digital) of 39,500.

== Ownership ==
It is part of the SPH Media group which also publishes The Straits Times, Berita Harian and The New Paper.

== History ==
It is an English-language newspaper published since 1 October 1976. Prior to this, it was a supplement in The Straits Times. The paper was launched on 15 July 1976, and the special presentation issue prior to the launch of the paper featured George Magnus. The staff was first headed by Tsai Tan, who became the first female editor of a daily newspaper in Singapore. In 1989, the newspaper won the Media Philanthropic Appeals category of the International Advertising Festival in New York.

== Community programmes ==
=== The Business Times Budding Artists Fund ===
The Business Times Budding Artists Fund was initiated in 2004 and adopted by The Business Times in 2005, with the aim to level the playing field and reach out to children and youths from financially disadvantaged backgrounds, ages six to 19. The Fund provides opportunities and access to the arts, it seeks to enable beneficiaries to learn, discover and nurture their talents so that they may grow in confidence and become resilient in overcoming their personal circumstances.

The Business Times co-organises ChildAid, an annual youth charity concert with The Straits Times to raise funds for needy children from The Straits Times School Pocket Money Fund and The Business Times Budding Artists Fund.

=== Business Awards ===
The Business Times organises the following business awards events on a yearly basis:

- The Singapore Business Awards
- The Singapore Corporate Awards
- The Enterprise 50 (E50) Awards
- The Emerging Enterprise Award
