= Ming Pao Monthly =

- Discipline: Literature, Politics
- Language: Traditional Chinese

Publication details
- History: 1966–present
- Publisher: Media Chinese International (Hong Kong, China)
- Frequency: Monthly

Standard abbreviations
- ISO 4: Ming Pao Mon.

Indexing
- ISSN: 0580-6291
- OCLC no.: 1715260

Links
- Journal homepage

Ming Pao Monthly (Chinese: 明報月刊; pinyin: Míngbào Yuèkān), or Mingbao Yuekan in pinyin, is a Chinese-language intellectual journal in Hong Kong, covering the humanities, scholarship, culture, politics, and thought in the Sinosphere.

== History ==
Ming Pao Monthly was founded by Jin Yong in 1966, hoping to pass on the torch of traditional Chinese culture. He recalled:

In publishing Ming Pao Monthly, we were determined to go against the Cultural Revolution. We have lived our whole lives in Chinese culture. We support the revolution of Chinese culture and the elimination of its dross, but we do not support the destruction of Chinese culture. We must not abandon China's thousands of years of tradition.

After the founding of Ming Pao Monthly, Jin Yong appointed himself as the editor-in-chief. Later, Hu Juren served as the editor-in-chief for 13 years. In 1991, Pan Yaoming began to take over as the editor-in-chief of Ming Pao Monthly.

Starting in the summer of 1967, the journal published the Collection of Documents on the Cultural Revolution of the Chinese Communist Party (Chinese: 《中共文化大革命資料彙編》), which consisted of six volumes and contained more than three million words. It also published Zhang Guotao's "My Memoirs".

China's earliest scar literature, such as "Big Blue Fish", "County Magistrate Yin", and "Geng Er in Beijing" written by Chen Ruoxi, were all published in Ming Pao Monthly in the 1970s. Nie Hualing's "Sang Qing and Tao Hong" was serialized in Taiwan's United Daily News, but was cut short for political reasons. It was also published in full in Ming Pao Monthly.

From 2014 to 2018, Ming Pao Monthly received funding from the Hong Kong Arts Development Council to add a cultural supplement for totaling 49 issues. From 2022 to 2023, Ming Pao Monthly received support from the Hong Kong Arts Development Council's to add the Ming Yue Bay cultural supplement for totaling 12 issues, with the title of the publication written by Jin Yaoji.

== Editorial stance ==
Different from the daily newspaper Ming Pao, Ming Pao Monthly was endowed with a strong academic nature from the beginning, similar to the mainland China's Dushu magazine. Ming Pao Monthly is not a radical journal with a clear advocacy, which is due to its creed of "independence, freedom, and tolerance". Ming Pao Monthly has been committed to the long-term exploration of certain academic topics such as Redology and Traditional Chinese Medicine versus Western Medicine. The journal's primary focus is on culture and scholarship; when it comes to politics, it claims to never be a mouthpiece for any party.

== See also ==
- Twenty-First Century
