= Media Chinese International =

Hong Kong media company

- Company type: Public limited company
- Traded as: SEHK: 685; MYX: 5090
- Founded: August 2004
- Headquarters: Malaysia, Petaling Jaya (Malaysia HQ); Hong Kong (Hong Kong HQ)
- Key people: Tan Sri Datuk Sir Tiong Hiew King, Honorary Chairman; Tiong Choon, Chairman; Tiong Kiew Chiong, Group CEO
- Products: Ming Pao; Sin Chew Daily; Nanyang Siang Pau; China Press; Guang Ming Daily
- Website: www.mediachinesegroup.com

Media Chinese International Limited
- Traditional Chinese: 世界華文媒體有限公司
- Simplified Chinese: 世界华文媒体有限公司
Transcriptions

Media Chinese International Limited is a Chinese-language media platform targeting Chinese readers in major Chinese communities in Southeast Asia. Its headquarters is located in Hong Kong. Tan Sri Datuk Sir Tiong Hiew King serves as the Honorary Chairman, while his daughter, Tiong Choon, holds the position of Chairman. The Tiong family is currently the controlling shareholder of the Company.

It was formed by the merger of Ming Pao Enterprise (Hong Kong), Sin Chew Media Corporation (Malaysia), and Nanyang Press Holdings (Malaysia) in April 2008 and its history can be traced back to the Malaysian operation units of Sin Poh (Star News) Amalgamated, which was founded by Aw Boon Haw in 1941. It is the first entity dually listed on the mainboards of the Stock Exchange of Hong Kong and the Bursa Malaysia (SEHK: 685, MYX: 005090) is. Media Chinese's product portfolio comprises 5 daily newspapers in 13 editions and 3 free newspapers with a total daily circulation of approximately 1 million copies, as well as about 30 magazines. The Group has also expanded its business into digital media. Media Chinese is the proprietor of Life Magazines, the largest Chinese language magazine publisher in Malaysia, and is the major shareholder of One Media Group Limited (SEHK: 426).

Additionally, the Company operates a travel business through its wholly owned subsidiary, Charming Holidays Limited.

Its head office is in the Ming Pao Industrial Centre (traditional Chinese: 明報工業中心; simplified Chinese: 明报工业中心) in Chai Wan.

== Key publications ==
Media Chinese has 5 well-established Chinese language newspapers.

- Ming Pao (明報): Launched on 20 May 1959, Ming Pao Daily News reports and analyzes economic, political and social events in the world. Editions are available in Hong Kong, New York City and San Francisco. Editions in Toronto and Vancouver ended on 16 January 2026.
- Sin Chew Daily (星洲日報): Launched on 15 January 1929, Sin Chew Daily ranks first in terms of circulation and readership in Peninsular Malaysia. It is also the largest Chinese-language newspaper in Southeast Asia in terms of circulation.
- China Press (中國報): Launched on 1 February 1946. On 19 May 1990, China Press launched an evening paper and it holds the largest market share in the evening paper market.
- Guang Ming Daily (光明日報): Launched on 18 December 1987, Guang Ming Daily is a Chinese-language newspaper in the northern region of Peninsular Malaysia. In 1994, its circulation network expanded to the entire Malaysia and it ranks third in terms of circulation and readership in Peninsular Malaysia.
- Nanyang Siang Pau (南洋商報): Launched on 6 September 1923, Nanyang Siang Pau is one of the oldest Chinese dailies in Malaysia. It is also one of the largest Chinese dailies, which ranks fourth in terms of circulation and readership in Peninsular Malaysia.

== Other publications ==
Media Chinese has over 30 magazine titles comprising categories of entertainment and lifestyle, technology, children and automotive.

=== Hong Kong publications ===
- Yazhou Zhoukan (亞洲周刊) – published weekly, and is the world's only Chinese-language international affairs magazine
- Ming Pao Weekly (明報周刊) – published weekly, and is a premium lifestyle and entertainment magazine in Hong Kong
- Ming Pao Monthly (明報月刊) – published weekly, and is an intellectual magazine in Hong Kong
- TopGear (HK edition) (極速誌) – a magazine with a mixture of entertainment and car-buying information

=== Mainland China publications ===
- Popular Science (科技新時代) – it leads the field of science and technology publications in mainland China
- TopGear (China edition) (汽车测试报告) – showcase for the finest and enthralling automobiles

=== Malaysian publications ===
- Bintang Sin Chew (小星星周刊) – is a national full-color children's weekly in Malaysia
- Sinaran Sin Chew (星星周刊) – published weekly, is a student publication recommended by the Ministry of Education
- Cahaya Sin Chew (學海周刊) – it conducts campaigns to encourage secondary school students to take Chinese exams

There are 21 additional magazine titles published under the Life Magazines, which is a member of the Nanyang Press Group. They include Feminine (風采), New Tide (新潮), Oriental Cuisine (美味風采), New Icon for Him (時尚男人), Long Life (大家健康), etc.

== See also ==
- Newspapers of Hong Kong
- Media in Hong Kong
- Singapore Press Holdings
  - SPH Media
