= SPH Media =

Media company in Singapore

SPH Media Trust

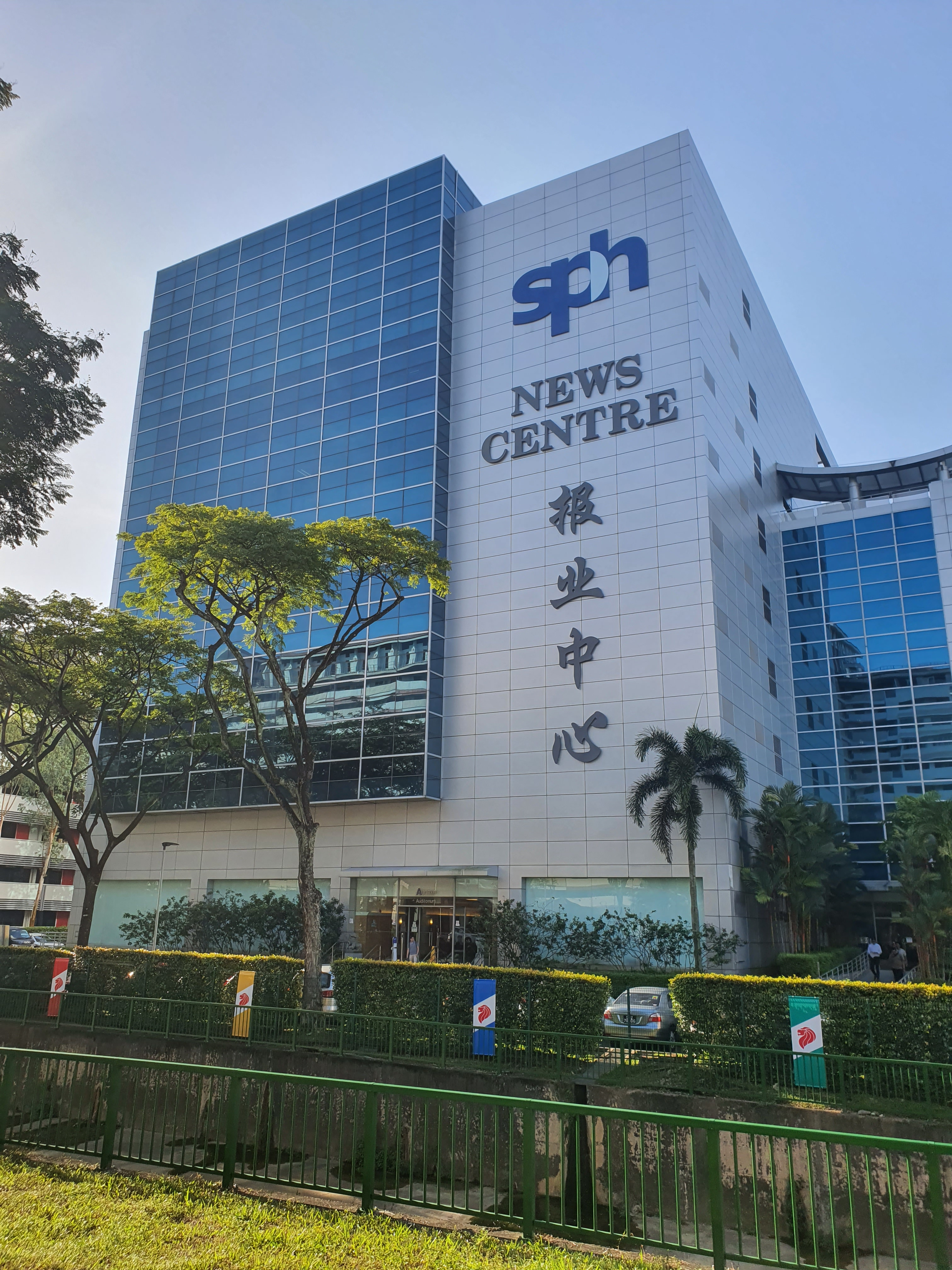
- Headquarters of SPH Media at Toa Payoh
- Type: Company limited by guarantee (SMT)
- Industry: Mass media
- Founded: 1 December 2021; 4 years ago
- Headquarters: Toa Payoh, Singapore
- Key people: Khaw Boon Wan (Chairman); Chan Yeng Kit (CEO)
- Number of employees: 2,500
- Website: www.sph.com.sg

SPH Media Trust (SMT), trading as SPH Media, is a mass media company in Singapore. It was incorporated on 19 July 2021 as a company limited by guarantee, having been spun off from Singapore Press Holdings as part of a restructuring. It owns several major newspapers in the country, including the English-language The Straits Times and The Business Times, Chinese-language Lianhe Zaobao and Shin Min Daily News, Malay-language Berita Harian, and the Tamil-language Tamil Murasu. The company also publishes magazines and operates five radio stations.

It forms part of a duopoly of the country's mass media, alongside the state-owned enterprise Mediacorp. SPH Media has over 2,500 employees, including a team of approximately 1,000 journalists, including correspondents operating around the world.

== History ==
Singapore Press Holdings Limited (SPH) was formed on 4 August 1984 through a merger of three organisations, The Straits Times Press Group, Singapore News and Publications Limited and Times Publishing Berhad.

SPH readership has stagnated since the early-2000s as Singaporeans increasingly turned to online media for their news consumption.

On 6 May 2021, SPH in response to shareholder pressures, had proposed that it would restructure itself and transfer its media business into a company limited by guarantee (CLG), which will be privately managed. The new company would initially be managed by the holders of SPH's management shareholders at the time, while still having to issue new management shares of the media business under the CLG as required by Newspaper and Printing Presses Act. The government would also lift the shareholder limits on the currently listed SPH entity. This new CLG was named SPH Media Trust.

On 10 September 2021, an extraordinary general meeting was convened over the restructuring proposal to transfer all media business-related assets and staff to SMT. Approximately 97.55% of the 300 shareholders voted in favour of the proposal. The transfer was completed on 1 December 2021. The assets transferred included its headquarters, News Center, and its press, Print Center, as well as all intellectual property and information technology assets. Along with the assets transfer, 2,500 staff were transferred to SMT as well. SPH had also injected SMT with S$80 million cash and S$30 million of SPH stocks and SPH REIT units.

As part of its restructuring, it discontinued the print publication of The New Paper on 11 December 2021, becoming a digital-only publication. It also merged the Lianhe Wanbao into the Shin Min Daily News on 24 December 2021, citing the limited number of Chinese media talent in the country, redundancy in content, and a plan to focus on bolstering its digital operations.

To aid with the restructuring of its operations, the Singapore government announced on 16 February 2022, that it would provide SMT up to S$900 million over the next five years, with the amount dependent on achieving certain targets such as reach and engagement of its products and to certain vernacular groups and youth.

A review of internal processes of SMT was started in March 2022 which included the reporting of circulation data. In January 2023, it was reported that daily circulation numbers of SPH's publications, including broadsheets The Straits Times and Lianhe Zaobao, were inflated by 10 to 12 percent. The figures were inflated due to double counting of subscriptions, a project account which was funded to purchase fictitious circulation and arbitrarily derived circulation numbers.

As of July 2025, SPH has continued to cover the Singaporean government favorably while also expanding collaborations with Chinese state media such as Xinhua News Agency.

On 10 September 2026, Khaw Boon Wan announced that he would step down as the chairman of the organisation with the current CEO, Chan Yeng Kit taking on the position. This change will be effective from 1 October 2026.

== Ownership ==
As a private company, SPH Media Trust is managed privately by its shareholders. The initial shareholders were made up of the management shareholders of Singapore Press Holdings, as SPH was a newspaper company as defined under the Newspaper and Printing Presses Act (NPPA) of 1974. The management shares are regulated through NPPA and its issuance and transfers have to be approved by the Ministry of Communications and Information, and in "any resolution relating to the appointment or dismissal of a director or any member of the staff" the vote of one management share is equivalent to 200 ordinary shares.

New management shares are to be issued to the individual media businesses under SMT.

The institutional members of SMT are:

- DBS Bank
- United Overseas Bank
- OCBC Bank
- Great Eastern Life
- Singtel
- CapitaLand
- Changi Airport Group
- PSA International
- Mapletree Investments
- Fullerton Limited
- Income Insurance
- NTUC Enterprise Co-Operative
- National University of Singapore
- Nanyang Technological University
- Singapore Management University
- Singapore University of Technology and Design

== Newspapers ==
SPH Media publishes 9 newspaper titles in four languages in Singapore.

English

- The Straits Times (Sunday edition: The Sunday Times)
- The Business Times (Saturday edition: The Business Times Weekend)
- The New Paper – English tabloid newspaper
- STOMP – citizen journalism web portal
- tabla! – free English language newspaper for the Indian community; 30,000 copies distributed each Friday at 7-Eleven outlets

Chinese

- Lianhe Zaobao (联合早报) (Sunday edition: zbSunday)
- Shin Min Daily News (新明日报) – Chinese tabloid newspaper

Malay

- Berita Harian (Sunday edition: Berita Minggu)

Tamil

- Tamil Murasu (தமிழ் முரசு)

== Magazines ==
SPH Media publishes and produces 9 magazine titles in Singapore and the region, covering a range of interests from lifestyle to information technology.

- F ZINE
- HardwareZone
- Harper's Bazaar Singapore
- Her World
- Home & Decor
- ICON
- Nüyou
- The Peak
- Singapore Women's Weekly

== Radio ==
SPH Media manages and operates 5 radio stations: 96.3 Hao FM and UFM100.3 in Mandarin, as well as MONEY FM 89.3, Kiss92 FM and One FM 91.3 in English.

Frequency	Station	Language	Genre	First air date
89.3 MHz	Money FM 89.3	English	Financial news and talks	29 January 2018
91.3 MHz	One FM 91.3	English	Classic adult contemporary	2 March 1991
92.0 MHz	Kiss92 FM	English	Hot adult contemporary	3 September 2012
96.3 MHz	96.3 Hao FM	Chinese	Classic hits; Infotainment	8 January 2018
100.3 MHz	UFM100.3	Chinese	Adult CHR	2 March 1991

== Other media ==
=== Straits Times Press ===
SPH Media's subsidiary Straits Times Press produces books and periodicals in English and Chinese.

=== Digital ===
Apart from AsiaOne and Tech In Asia, SPH Media's online and new media initiatives include STJobs, online portal for jobs; and STClassifieds for general classified ads.

=== Advertising ===
SPH Media has ventured into outdoor advertising through its digital out-of-home platform SPHMBO.

== See also ==
- List of state media by country
- Media Prima
  - New Straits Times Press
- Media Chinese International
