= Tech in Asia =

Singaporean technology website

Tech in Asia Pte Ltd
- Company type: Private
- Industry: News Publishing
- Founded: August 1, 2010; 15 years ago
- Founder: Willis Wee
- Headquarters: Singapore
- Area served: Southeast Asia, Jakarta
- Key people: Terence Lee (editor-in-chief)
- Owner: SPH Media; (2024–present)
- Number of employees: 100
- Website: www.techinasia.com

Tech in Asia is a Singapore- and Jakarta-based technology news website covering topics on startups and innovation in Asia. Backed by Facebook co-founder Eduardo Saverin in 2015, it has hosted annual conferences across the continent primarily in Singapore, Tokyo, and Jakarta since 2012.

In January 2024, it was reported that SPH Media had completed its purchase of the company.

== History and growth ==
Founded in 2010 by Willis Wee during his third year at university, Tech in Asia maintains a focus on Asian and Southeast Asian countries, often covering startups and legislative developments from Singapore, Philippines, Indonesia, Vietnam, Thailand, Malaysia, China and India.

One year before offering its articles through its subscription program in November 2017, it raised US$6.6 million in funding led by Hanwha Investment and Securities.

In 2018, in addition to launching a marketing agency providing integrated media, marketing, events, and design solutions for brands, it also hosts annual Tech in Asia Conference for tech companies and VCs in Asia.

In October 2018, Tech in Asia launched its subscription program where it moved from offering free articles previously to a paywall-like structure. In its initial iteration, the single-tier paid subscription offered users access to five free articles per month, after which they were asked to pay US$18 a month or US$180 a year.

Currently, the portal offers three subscription plans, ranging from free to US$16.58 per month. All of its plans are billed yearly, with the uppermost tier now costing US$199 per year. A mid-level subscription, priced at US$59 per year, offers limited access to the portal's "Premium" coverage.

=== 2024–present: Acquired by SPH Media ===
In January 2024, it was reported that SPH Media had completed its purchase of the company.

In July 2025, Tech in Asia announced that it was winding down its Indonesia product, as part of streamlining operations. It also laid off 18% of its workforce at the same time.

On 31 March 2026, the CEO, Willis Wee and its chief operating officer, Maria Li resigned from their roles, and editor-in-chief, Terence Lee took over the operations of Tech in Asia. From April 2026 onwards, Tech in Asia would be integrated further into SPH Media, forming a new Features & Lifestyle Division with the Lifestyle Media team from SPH Media's Content and Solutioning Division.
