= The Zephyrhills News =

- Type: Weekly newspaper
- Owner: Linville Enterprises LLC
- Editor: Jan Linville
- Founded: 1911
- Headquarters: 38333 5th Ave., Zephyrhills, FL 33542
- Circulation: 7,800
- Website: thezephyrhillsnewsonline.com

The Zephyrhills News, located in Zephyrhills, Florida, United States, is a weekly broadsheet newspaper located in Pasco County just north of Tampa. It is the second oldest business still in operation in the city, founded in 1911 as the Zephyrhills Colonist. It publishes every Thursday.

The newspaper is owned by Linville Enterprises LLC, the publisher is Danny Linville, and the editor is Jan Linville. Its marketing campaign says it is the "local source since 1911." Daily papers in the market include the Pasco Tribune published by the Tampa Tribune, and the Pasco Times published by the St. Petersburg Times.

== History ==
The birth of the newspaper can be attributed to the efforts of Civil War Capt. H.B. Jeffries, who started the Colony Co. to help create a retirement community in Florida for retiring former Union soldiers. After finding land in Pasco County, Jeffries named the rolling land "Zephyrhills" and began to sell parcels. Needing an avenue to advertise real estate, Jeffries looked to a soldier who once saved his life, G.H. Gibson, to start a newspaper. Gibson, who was the publisher of a newspaper in Loup City, Nebraska called The Standard Gauge, accepted what was considered a "lucrative" offer from Jeffries to move to the new Zephyrhills and start the Zephyrhills Colonist a year later.

Gibson had his entire plant shipped by rail to Zephyrhills, but the equipment arrived before the press plant itself was completed. So, for the first several months of its existence, the Colonist was written, composed and printed outside. The equipment would be covered each night while staff members would stand guard until the roof and walls were completed.

A decade later, Sam Lovett would take over the paper and rename it the Zephyrhills News. He, in turn, sold the paper to a group of Zephyrhills businessmen in 1930 led by Dr. Bernard A. Thomas, a dentist. Following Thomas' death, the paper was purchased by Walter Gall who sold the newspaper to Howard Berg in 1948. In 1950, the paper was sold again, this time to George Johnson, who owned newspapers in Kentucky, Tennessee and Florida. However, Johnson himself died soon after the purchase was complete, and his widow sold the publication back to the Gibson family, with Floyd Gibson—G.H.'s son—taking over.

After Floyd became mayor of Zephyrhills, he sold the paper to a Rock Island, Ill. journalist named George Wickstrom in 1955. His son, Bernie Wickstrom, would become editor-in-chief. The younger Wickstrom remained its editor until his death on Sept. 10, 1987.

George Wickstrom sold the paper to The New York Times Company on Dec. 15, 1978. In the 1980s, the paper would change hands twice, first to Asterisk Publishing Company in 1984 and later Republic Newspapers in 1988. The paper's current owners, Danny and Jan Linville, purchased the paper from Scripps Zephyrhills News LLC on June 4, 2009.

== Office locations ==
The offices of the paper were once located on Fifth Avenue where the current First Baptist Church of Zephyrhills now stands.

In 1947, the paper moved to Sixth Street. Eight years later, it had moved back to Fifth Avenue where a consignment shop currently sits. It would move into its current facility at 38333 Fifth Avenue on Feb. 22, 1959.

== Community impact ==
- Alice Hall, a reporter for the paper during the Bernie Wickstrom era, has a recreation center named after her in the city.
- Editor Bernie Wickstrom has a bandstand named after him near the Alice Hall center on the shores of Lake Zephyr.
- In the late 1970s, when the city's police chief, Bill Eiland, was fired, intensive coverage from the paper led a community outcry that ended with Florida's first successful recall election. Two city council members were removed, and their replacements rehired Eiland. The city has since named a gazebo after him while Pasco County officials have named a boulevard in his memory.
- Floyd Gibson, a former publisher of the paper and son of the newspaper's founder, was elected mayor in the 1950s but, ran into some trouble when he didn't like what his former newspaper was printing about the city's administration. According to stories of that time period, Gibson—who as mayor ran the police department—had a reporter for the paper arrested and jailed without food or water for three days. The jailing came apparently after the reporter punched Gibson in the face.

== Editors ==
- G.H. Gibson (1911–1920)
- Sam Lovett (1921–1930)
- Bernard Thompson (1930)
- Walter Gall
- Howard Berg (1948–1950)
- Floyd Gibson
- George Wickstrom (1955-?)
- Bernie Wickstrom (1955–1987)
- Steve Spina (1987)
- Pamela Jansson (1987–1988)
- Fritz Wandell (1988)
- Bernard McGovern (1988–1989)
- Ellis Sandoz (1989)
- Gary Corsair (1993-1995)
- Dave Walters (1995–1997)
- Michael Hinman (1997–1998)
- Jack Cormier (1998–2000)
- Dave Hasselman (2000–2004)
- Gary S. Hatrick (2004–2007)
- Ryan O'Reilly (2007)
- M.L. Van Valkenburgh (2007)
- Ashley Reams (2007–2008)
- Erica Simons (2008–2009)
- Jan Linville (2009)
