= Lianhe Wanbao =

Former Chinese newspaper in Singapore

- Native name: 联合晚报
- Type: Daily newspaper
- Format: Broadsheet
- Owner: SPH Media
- Publisher: SPH Media
- Founded: 16 March 1983; 43 years ago (merger between the Singaporean editions of Nanyang Siang Pau and Sin Chew Jit Poh) (14,163 issues)
- Ceased publication: 24 December 2021; 4 years ago (merged into Shin Min Daily News)
- Language: Chinese
- Headquarters: Toa Payoh, Singapore
- Circulation: 139,066 (2016)
- Website: www.wanbao.com.sg

Former logo until 2017 revamp

Lianhe Wanbao (Chinese: 联合晚报; pinyin: Liánhé Wǎnbào; literally Joint Evening News) was a Singapore Chinese-language afternoon newspaper published daily by SPH Media from 16 March 1983 after the merger between the Singaporean editions of Nanyang Siang Pau and Sin Chew Jit Poh.

Lianhe Wanbao focused mainly on local and entertainment news with minimal international coverage. As such it was in competition with another SPH paper Shin Min Daily News. Amongst Singapore readers Lianhe Wanbao was often regarded more of a tabloid published in broadsheet form, and the veracity of some reports (mostly reproduced from tabloids or gossip magazines from Hong Kong or Taiwan) was sometimes questioned.

In 2021, Lianhe Wanbao merged into Shin Min Daily News, and published its last edition on 24 December.

== History ==
The newspaper was started along with Lianhe Zaobao (Joint Morning News) in March 1983 as part of the Singaporean editions of Nanyang Siang Pau and Sin Chew Jit Poh merger. It had 40,000 subscribers at launch, which grew to 100,000 in November that year.

On 1 January 2005, Lianhe Wanbao underwent a restructuring and reformatting. The paper adopted more serious reporting than Shin Min Daily and tried to attract younger readers through the use of colorful, uncluttered formatting.

From 1 October 2007, Lianhe Wanbao unveiled a new layout and a new focus in content, aimed at attracting young readers, including young professionals and executives. At the same time, Peter Ong took over as its chief editor. On the occasion of the paper's 30th anniversary in 2013, mobile apps were launched and a digital subscription model was announced.

In November 2013, news sites AsiaOne and Lianhe Wanbao suggested that politician Nicole Seah was dating a married man. The man in the photograph of her was Steven Goh, CEO of social site mig33, who was divorced. Seah demanded an apology from Singapore Press Holdings, the parent company of both AsiaOne and Lianhe Wanbao. Both issued an apology to Seah.

In 2021, it was announced that Lianhe Wanbao would be merged with Shin Min Daily News, with the latter taking control of the former's assets. The last edition of Lianhe Wanbao was published on 24 December; after the Christmas printing holiday, the merger would be completed on 26 December. Khaw Boon Wan, chairman of SPH Media Trust, stated that the change would help deal with funding issues by publishing only one evening paper and give time to seniors to adjust to digital news media.

== See also ==
- List of newspapers in Singapore
- List of newspapers
