= Lianhe Zaobao =

Singapore-based Chinese-language newspaper

Lianhe Zaobao / Zaobao Sunday 联合早报 / 早报星期天
- Type: Daily newspaper
- Format: Broadsheet
- Owner: SPH Media
- Publisher: SPH Media
- Editor: Goh Sin Teck
- Founded: 16 March 1983; 43 years ago (merger between the Singaporean editions of Nanyang Siang Pau and Sin Chew Jit Poh) (15,855 issues)
- Language: Chinese
- Headquarters: Toa Payoh, Singapore
- Circulation: 136,900 (Print+Digital as of 2021)
- Website: www.zaobao.com.sg

Nanyang Sin-Chew Lianhe Zaobao, (Note: Chinese: 南洋·星洲联合早报; pinyin: Nányáng Xīngzhōu Liánhé Zǎobào; Wade–Giles: Nan^{2}-yang^{2} Hsing^{1}-chou^{1} Lien^{2}-ho^{4} Tsao^{3}-pao^{4}; literally "Nanyang Sin-Chew Joint Morning Paper") commonly abbreviated as Lianhe Zaobao, (Note: 联合早报; Liánhé Zǎobào; Lien^{2}-ho^{2} Tsao^{3}-pao^{4}; literally "Joint Morning Paper") is the largest Singaporean Chinese-language newspaper with a daily circulation of about 136,900 (print and digital) as of 2021. Published by SPH Media (formerly Singapore Press Holdings), it was formed on 16 March 1983 as a result of a merger between the Singaporean editions of Nanyang Siang Pau and Sin Chew Jit Poh, two of Singapore's oldest Chinese newspapers.

The paper establishes itself as a broadsheet with local news coverage, while international news tend to be largely centred on the East Asia region, with a section dedicated to China. Zaobao has an East Asian correspondent network spanning Beijing, Chongqing, Shanghai, Guangzhou, Hong Kong, Taipei, Seoul and Tokyo. It is SPH's flagship Chinese daily and the only Chinese-language daily in Singapore. Lianhe Zaobao is the only Chinese-language overseas newspaper which can be purchased in major cities of the People's Republic of China. As with all Chinese-language publications currently based in Singapore, the paper is printed in Simplified Chinese.

== History ==
In 1974, after the Newspaper and Printing Presses Act was passed in Singapore, the Singapore branch of Sin Chew Jit Poh was reorganised into a public entity under the name Sin Chew Jit Poh (Singapore), while the Singapore edition of Nanyang Siang Pau became owned by Nanyang Press Singapore. The two Chinese broadsheets in Singapore merged in March 1983 in anticipation of the impending falling readership, due to English being taught as first language in Singaporean schools. The merger led to the formation of Singapore News and Publications, which published the morning paper Lianhe Zaobao as well as the evening paper Lianhe Wanbao. Lianhe Zaobao was the most read newspaper in Singapore among all English and Chinese newspapers, according to a survey conducted by Survey Research Singapore in 1983, with a readership of 689,000 on weekdays and 743,000 on Sundays. On 4 August 1984, the company merged with The Straits Times Press Group and Times Publishing Berhad to form Singapore Press Holdings.

From 8 September 2016, the portal also presents news from two other Singapore Press Holdings Chinese-language newspapers, Lianhe Wanbao and Shin Min Daily News. According to The Washington Post, "Zaobao's combined print and digital circulation in Singapore fell from 187,900 in 2015 to 144,000 in 2020, according to company filings."

According to a 2021 study from the Reuters Institute for the Study of Journalism, the paper has a weekly offline reach of 8% and online reach of 7% in Singapore.

== Editorial stance ==
Zaobao is regarded as pro-Beijing by Western and Taiwanese media outlets.⁣ The newspaper has included articles from pro-Beijing sources such as People's Daily, HK01, Ming Pao, Global Times, China Times and United Daily News. It is one of the few foreign newspapers allowed in China, where all media is tightly controlled and content censored. According to Radio Free Asia, content about the 1989 Tiananmen Square protests and massacre has been censored from the Zaobao website when accessed from Hong Kong. Since 2016, Zaobao has featured opinion columns from Chinese Communist Party officials without noting their party affiliation.

A 2019 study by Scotland-based researcher Daniel Hammond found that Zaobao played the role of "China's critical friend in Southeast Asia", using the region as a means to deliver its concerns and criticisms of the country's actions such as on the South China Sea, while covering the China-Singapore relationship in an overwhelmingly positive manner.

In April 2021, Zaobao renamed its "Greater China" section, which covers Taiwan, to simply "China." In December 2021, Zaobao interviewed Peng Shuai following her disappearance. The interview, which critics labeled as scripted, generated criticisms of the newspaper.

In July 2023, The Washington Post reported that the paper had taken a more pro-Beijing stance by creating a China-specific version of the website to avoid having its website blocked in China. Zaobao issued a rebuttal in response to the Washington Post article, stressing that it maintained journalistic neutrality and independence. Singapore's ambassador to the US Lui Tuck Yew also responded by saying that in his former role as Singaporean Ambassador to China, he often heard Zaobao's readers of various nationalities affirm the paper's balanced coverage and uniquely Singaporean viewpoints, adding that it was "misguided for American news outlets to expect Zaobao to resemble the Washington Post, or for Singapore to follow either the United States or China."

At the September 2023 centennial celebration of the newspaper, Prime Minister of Singapore Lee Hsien Loong said he was "heartened that Zaobao has been unwavering in its principles, and has remained independent and objective in its news reporting." He added that when publishing articles by foreign contributors, "Zaobao should also ensure that its readers are aware who these writers are speaking for and recognise that these views do not represent Zaobao's stance."

== Format ==
=== Broadsheet ===
The paper is published daily by SPH and usually hits newsstands and homes by 5 am local time. Zaobao is currently published in three segments. The first comprises breaking news (焦点新闻) and local news under ZaobaoSINGAPORE (早报新加坡). The second comprises ZaobaoChina (早报中国), the sports section (早报体育), obituaries, the daily editorial, commentaries, letters to the press, other international news from the ASEAN, followed by a finance section ZaobaoBUSINESS (早报财经). A supplementary lifestyle, arts and entertainment segment is named Fukan (副刊) with classified advertising at the back of that segment.

The Sunday edition is titled zbSunday (早报星期天), with a tabloid-format lifestyle supplement pull-out zbWeekly (早报周刊).

=== Zaobao Digital ===
The newspaper is available in Southeast Asia, China, Hong Kong as well as organisations such as the United Nations. The online version of the paper Zaobao.com was launched in August 1995 under the name of "Lianhe Zaobao Online". It serves as a news portal drawing news not just from the Lianhe Zaobao, but also from other Chinese newspapers in the region. A large proportion of Lianhe Zaobao's daily readership is derived from China, with the official website cites a monthly online readership of 4 million originating from China.

Zaobao.com is targeted at audiences in Greater China, while Zaobao.sg (re-launched in September 2016) targets local and non-China readers. In 2019, Lianhe Zaobao launched an English-language e-magazine called ThinkChina.

== ZBSchools.sg ==
ZBSchools.sg is an online portal hosting several publications targeted at students such as zbCOMMA (早报逗号), Thumbs Up (大拇指), Thumbs Up Junior (小拇指) and Thumbs Up Little Junior (小小拇指). zbCOMMA is targeted at secondary school students, Thumbs Up at upper primary students, Thumbs Up Junior at lower primary students and Thumbs Up Little Junior at kindergarten students.

zbCOMMA used to be known as Friday Weekly (星期5周报) before its revamp on 7 January 2009. It consists of follow-ups on news on Lianhe Zaobao, articles written by Zaobao reporters and blurbs for Zaobao news that serve to connect students with Zaobao.

== Blocking in China ==
The Zaobao online website is occasionally blocked in mainland China, or has its posts removed on Sina Weibo. In 2009, the Zaobao website was temporarily blocked in China, analysts in China believed it was likely related to an article Lianhe Zaobao ran headlined "Cyber Crackdown in China Angers Netizens" which sparked the temporary ban, as discourse against the Chinese government is censored. The paper was again reportedly blocked in 2017 with no official reasons cited.

== See also ==
- List of newspapers in Singapore
- List of newspapers
- Censorship in Singapore
- SPH Media

== Print sources ==
- , Our 70 years: history of leading Chinese newspapers in Singapore (1993), Published by Singapore Press Holdings
