= China Press =

Malaysian Chinese-language newspaper

- Type: Daily newspaper
- Format: Broadsheet
- Owner: The China Press Berhad
- Founder: Henry Lee Hau Shik
- Founded: February 1, 1946; 80 years ago
- Language: Mandarin
- Headquarters: Kuala Lumpur, Malaysia
- Circulation: 154,538 (daily); 48,207 (Night Edition); 9,686 (daily E-paper)
- Website: www.chinapress.com.my

The China Press (simplified Chinese: 中国报; traditional Chinese: 中國報; pinyin: Zhōngguó Bào) is a Malaysian Chinese-language newspaper founded by Henry Lee Hau Shik and was also owned at some point by Cheong Yoke Choy. First published on February 1, 1946, in Kuala Lumpur, it was the second-most popular Chinese daily newspaper in Malaysia by circulation in 2015. As of November 2022, it is considered the most popular Chinese language news portal in the country.

The China Press was suspended for a month in 1969 following its publication of a court news item in the aftermath of the 13 May Incident.

To capitalize on its popularity, China Press launched an evening edition on May 19, 1990, with the stated mission of "Today News Tonight Know". In 1993, Nanyang Press assumed management of China Press. Both publications are owned by Media Chinese International Limited (MCIL), which also publishes Sin Chew Daily, Guang Ming Daily, and Ming Pao.
