= Sin Chew Jit Poh (Singapore) =

Former chinese newspaper in Singapore

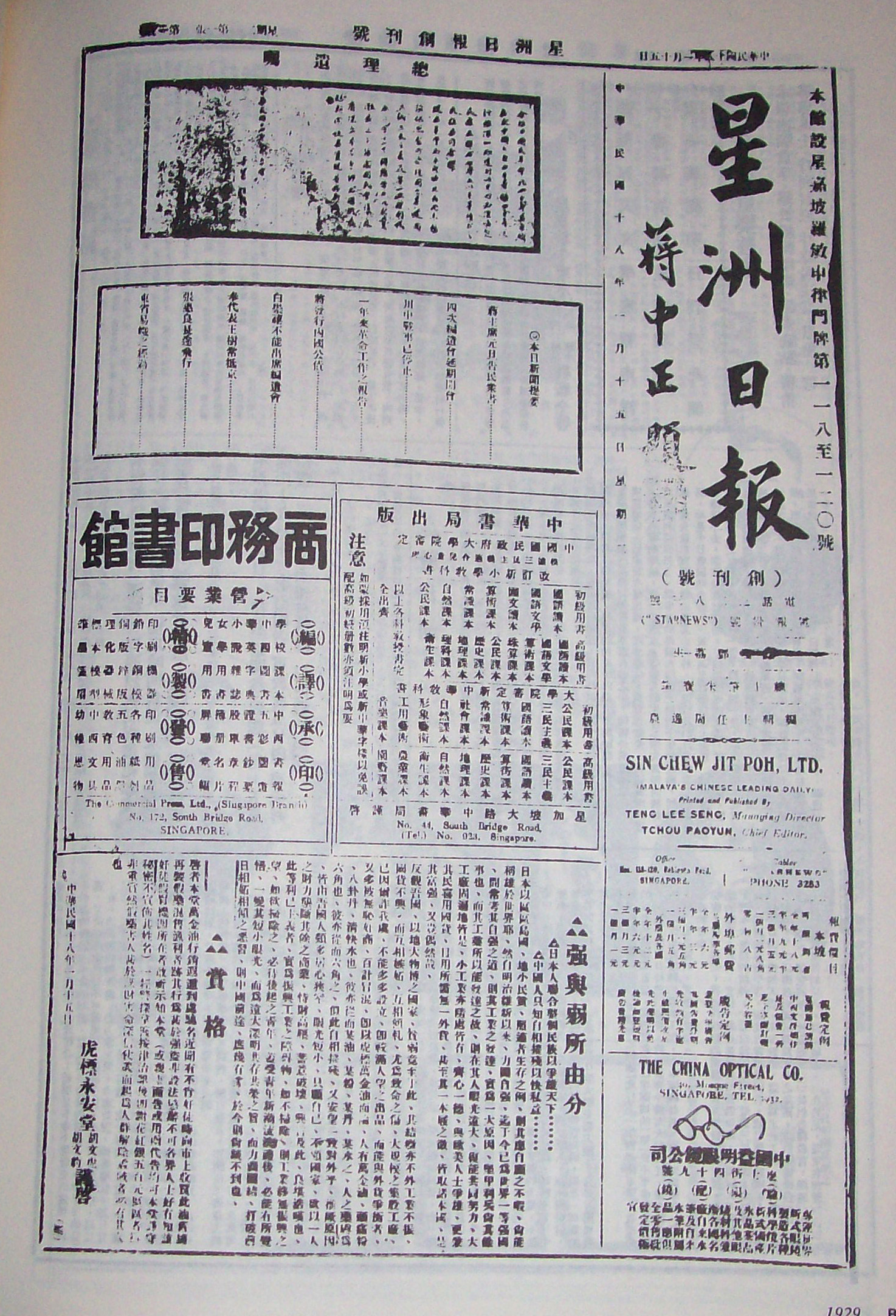
- First issue
- Native name: 星洲日報
- Type: Daily newspaper
Owner(s)
Aw family (via various investment vehicle)	(1929–1975)
shareholders of Sin Chew Jit Poh (Singapore) Limited	(1975–1982)
Singapore News and Publications	(1982–1983)
- Founder: Aw Boon Haw
Publisher
Sin Chew Jit Poh Ltd.	(1929–1941)
Sin Poh Amalgamated Ltd.	(1941–1975)
Sin Chew Jit Poh (Singapore) Ltd.	(1975–1982)
Singapore News and Publications Ltd.	(1982–1983)
- Founded: 1928 (foundation of the publisher); 15 January 1929 (first issue)
- Ceased publication: 1983
- Language: Chinese; (in Traditional Chinese characters, later simplified Chinese characters)
- Country: British Singapore and Singapore
Sister newspapers
Sin Chew Jit Poh	(Malaysia edition)
Sin Pin Jit Poh	(founded by Aw in Penang)
Sing Tao Daily	(founded by Aw in Hong Kong)
Sing Sian Yer Pao	(founded by Aw in Bangkok)
- OCLC number: 222378503
- Free online archives: Singapore National Library

Sin Chew Jit Poh
- Traditional Chinese: 星洲日報
- Simplified Chinese: 星洲日报
- Literal meaning: Singapore Daily
Transcriptions
Standard Mandarin
- Hanyu Pinyin: Xīngzhōu Rìbào
- Wade–Giles: Hsing1-chou1 Jih4-pao4
Southern Min
- Hokkien POJ: Seng-chiu Ji̍t-pò

Sin Chew Jit Poh was a Singapore newspaper. It was founded by Aw Boon Haw in Singapore. In the 1960s, it started its Malaysian bureau in Petaling Jaya, with full function printing house. The Malaysian edition started to become a separate sister newspaper since they have the full function from news report writing to printing. Due to the Newspaper and Printing Presses Act enacted in 1974, starting from 1975, the two newspapers in Singapore and Malaysia had separate ownership. The Singapore edition was owned by Sin Chew Jit Poh (Singapore) Limited, while the Malaysian edition was sold by Sin Poh Amalgamated in 1982.

Singapore's Sin Chew Jit Poh ceased publication in Singapore in March 1983 and subsequently merged with Singapore's branch of Nanyang Siang Pau to become Lianhe Zaobao and Lianhe Wanbao; their parent companies, were merged in 1982 as Singapore News and Publications Limited, a predecessor of Singapore monopoly Singapore Press Holdings.

The Malaysian version of Sin Chew Jit Poh (now Sin Chew Daily) is still in circulation.

== Gallery ==
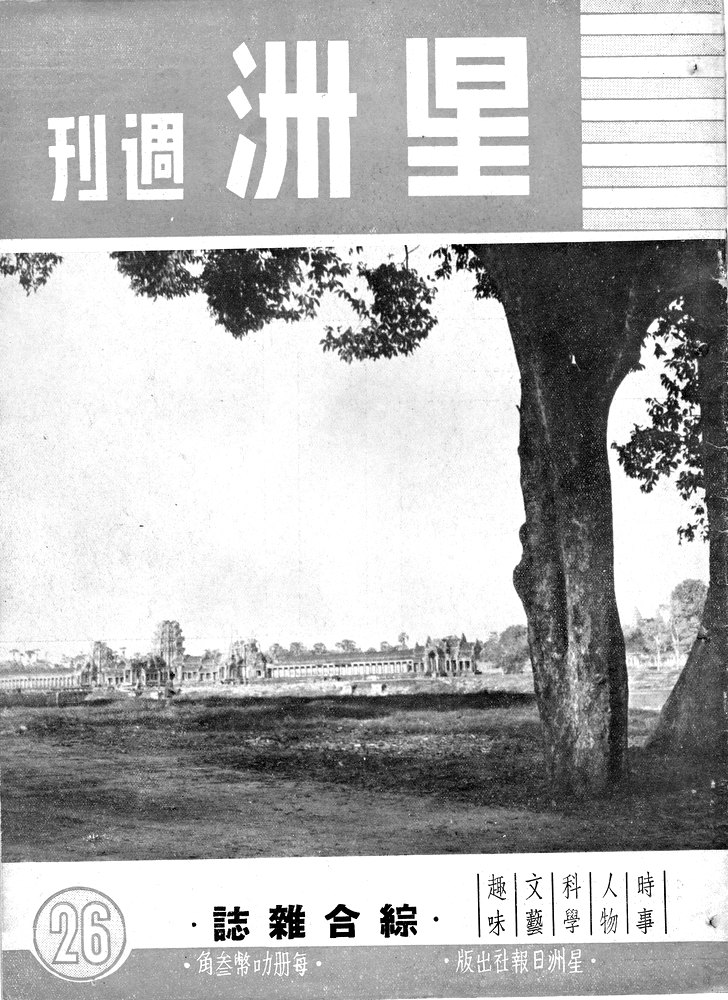
Sin Chew Weekly, a sister publication in 1951
