= Guang Ming Daily (Malaysia) =

Chinese-language newspaper in Malaysia

- Type: Daily newspaper
- Format: Print, online
- Owner: Media Chinese International
- Founded: 1987
- Language: Mandarin
- Website: http://www.guangming.com.my/

Guang Ming Daily (simplified Chinese: 光明日报; traditional Chinese: 光明日報; pinyin: Guāngmíng Rìbào) is the third-largest circulation Chinese-language newspaper published in Malaysia. Formerly known as Sin Pin Jit Poh or Sin Pin Daily (Chinese: 星檳日報; Pe̍h-ōe-jī: Seng-pin Ji̍t-pò), it was founded by Aw Boon Haw.

Sin Pin Daily was headquartered in Penang. It stopped publishing in 1986 after major changes in management, and the former staff started the Guang Ming Daily in December 1987 with help from Lim Keng Yaik.

In 1992, the Rimbunan Hijau Group bought Guang Ming Daily — making it a sister company of Sin Chew Daily, which was also founded by Aw. As of 2024, both publications are currently owned by Media Chinese International Limited, which also publishes Nanyang Siang Pau, China Press and Ming Pao.
