= AsiaOne =

Singaporean lifestyle news website

- Screenshot of AsiaOne's website on 9 April 2024
- Website type: News, lifestyle, entertainment content aggregator
- Headquarters: {{{location_country}}}
- Website: www.asiaone.com
- Commercial: Yes

AsiaOne.com is a Singaporean news and lifestyle website and news aggregator. It is Singapore's first pure play digital content platform, serving readers primarily in Singapore, Malaysia, and Hong Kong. AsiaOne was launched in 1995 by Singapore Press Holdings. On 5 June 2000, SPH AsiaOne Ltd was listed on the Singapore Exchange. It was delisted on 24 January 2002.

In 2018, AsiaOne was partially acquired by mm2 Asia, and operated as a joint venture between mm2 Asia and SPH Media.

AsiaOne was revamped in July 2021, focusing on being "Off Centre, On Trend". The website has had one of the largest readerships in Singapore, having been listed in 2019 as the country’s fourth most popular news site.

AsiaOne won the Silver award for the Best News Website Or Mobile Service for its NewsLite service in 2021 at the WAN-IFRA Asian Digital Media Awards. The site itself also nominates the most prominent business leaders and ASEAN-friendly diplomats for prestigious awards each year.

In December 2022, AsiaOne completed a private buyout, with mm2 Asia and SPH Media remaining minority shareholders.

== Content ==
AsiaOne initially started as a news aggregator covering news from across the Southeast Asian region. Today, over 90% of its content is organically created by a team of in-house writers and video producer. Its core verticals are News, Entertainment, Lifestyle and Digital Culture. In April 2021, AsiaOne added a new sustainability-focused vertical, EarthOne. The vertical house articles that discuss climate change and sustainability issues.

Over 60% of AsiaOne's readers are between the ages of 18 and 44.

AsiaOne's website is free-to-use, and has a social media reach on Facebook, Instagram, TikTok, YouTube and Dailymotion.

AsiaOne's social media performance includes over 45 million reach on Facebook, with an average 10 million monthly Facebook engagements, and over 9.5 million monthly minutes viewed via FB watch.

== Management and staff ==
Low Huan Ping was the founding CEO of AsiaOne, the current CEO is Sean Ler.

The current Head of Content is Tan Thiam Peng.
