= Sin Chew Daily =

Chinese language newspaper in Malaysia

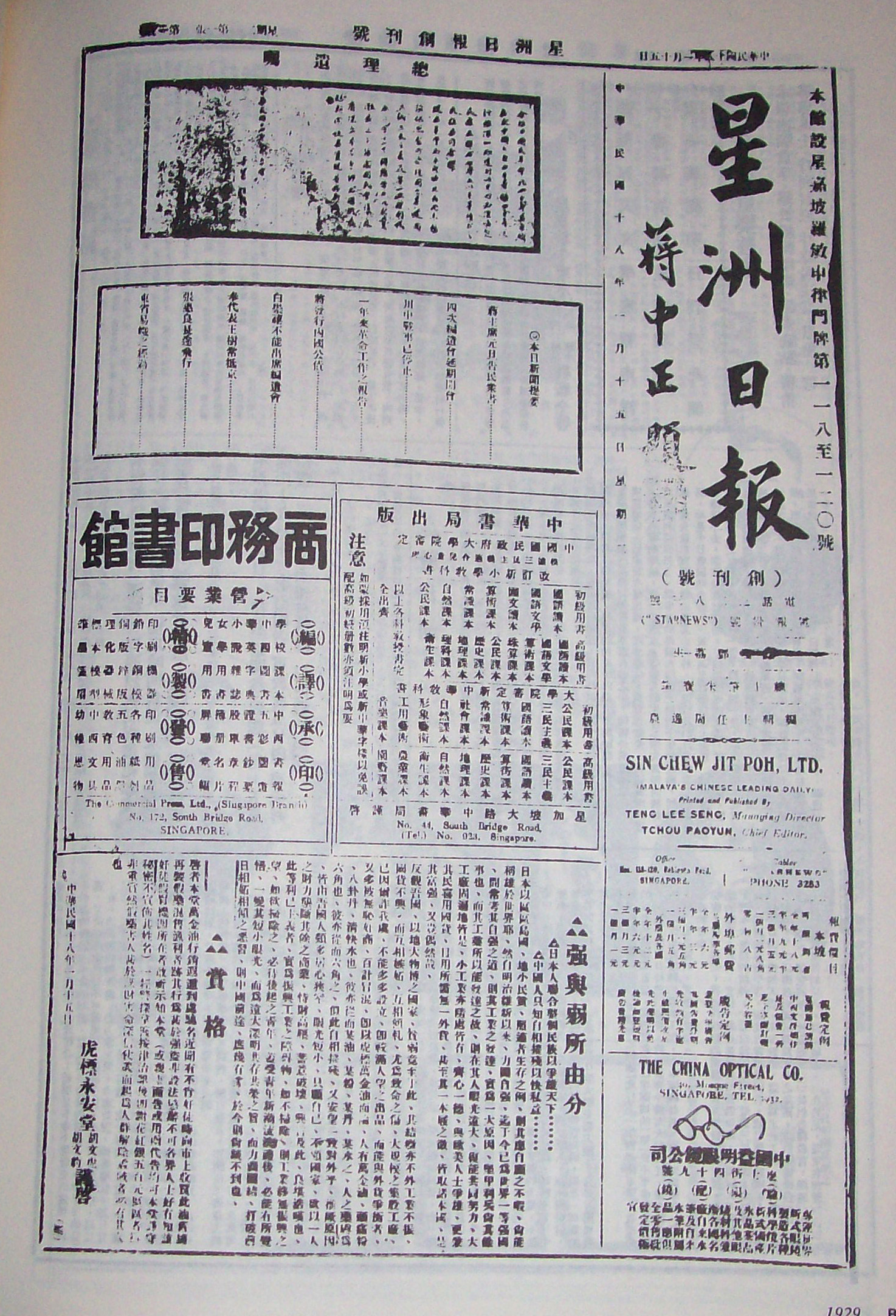
- Singapore first issue in 1929
- Type: Daily newspaper
- Format: Broadsheet
- Owner(s): Media Chinese International Limited (main owner); Sin Chew Media Corporation Berhad; Sin Poh (Star News) Amalgamated (Until 1982)
- Founder: Aw Boon Haw
- Publisher: Media Chinese International
- Editor: Kuik Cheng Kang
- Founded: 15 January 1929; 97 years ago in Singapore, Straits Settlements
- Political alignment: Malaysian Chinese Association (Barisan Nasional)
- Language: Chinese
- City: Petaling Jaya
- Country: Malaysia
- Circulation: 340,584 (West Malaysia); 52,711 (Sarawak); 12,102 (night edition); 55,291 (e-paper) (Note: Source: Audit Bureau of Circulations, Malaysia - July to December 2015)
- Website: www.sinchew.com.my

Sin Chew Daily (Chinese: 星洲日報), formerly known as Sin Chew Jit Poh (Pe̍h-ōe-jī: Seng-chiu Ji̍t-pò), is a Chinese-language newspaper in Malaysia. According to report from the Audit Bureau of Circulation for the period ending 31 December 2011, Sin Chew Daily has an average daily circulation of almost 500,000 copies and also the largest-selling Chinese-language newspaper outside Greater China. It is only on Sundays that the circulation of the Malaysian Malay newspapers exceeds that of Sin Chew Daily.

Sin Chew Daily is owned by Sin Chew Media Corporation Berhad, a subsidiary of Media Chinese International Limited. It is a member of the Asia News Network. It is circulated throughout Malaysia and neighboring countries, in Southern Thailand, Brunei and Indonesia. It is also published and printed in Indonesia and Cambodia, under different mastheads.

Sin Chew Daily has 53 news bureaus and six printing plants in Peninsular and East Malaysia.

== History ==
Sin Chew Daily was founded on 15 January 1929, by Aw Boon Par and Aw Boon Haw, founder of the Tiger Balm in Singapore, which was then a part of the Straits Settlements. The newspaper formed a part of the Star Amalgamated Newspaper formed by these two philanthropists. The newspaper was suspended between 1942 and 1945 during the Japanese occupation of Malaya and Singapore.

A Kuala Lumpur office was established in 1950. Even after the secession of Singapore from Malaysia in 1965, Sin Chew Daily initially still operated with its headquarters in Singapore under the management of descendant of the Aw brothers. In order to expedite the printing process, in 1966, Sin Chew Daily built a new plant located at its present head office premises in Petaling Jaya. With the setting up of this new plant, other departments such as the news desk, editorial, production and circulation were started.

After separation, the Petaling Jaya operation increasingly became independent from the head office in Singapore. Following the directives from the Malaysian government on restraining foreigners from controlling the press, the Aw family transferred their ownership of Sin Chew Daily to Lim Kheng Kim in 1982. The Singaporean version eventually merged with Nanyang Siang Pau not long after to form Lianhe Zaobao and Lianhe Wanbao, the latter of which would also merge again with Shin Min Daily News in 2021.

In 1987, Sin Chew Daily sank into deep financial trouble, and a receiver was appointed over the company. On 27 October 1987, the publication licence of Sin Chew Daily was suspended under Operasi Lalang, one of the most drastic clampdowns on civil dissent launched by the government. Tiong Hiew King, an entrepreneur from Sarawak, acquired Sin Chew Daily in 1988. After five months 11 days, Sin Chew Daily resumed publication on 8 April 1988.

In the early 1990s, Sin Chew Daily emerged as the best-selling Chinese newspaper, beating Nanyang Siang Pau, the leading Chinese newspaper then.

=== Merger of parent companies ===
On 29 January 2007, the merger of Sin Chew Media Corporation, Hong Kong Ming Pao Enterprise Corporation and Nanyang Press Holdings was announced.

On 30 April 2008, the newly formed Media Chinese International Limited (MCIL) unprecedentedly listed on both Bursa Malaysia and Hong Kong Stock Exchange.

After the merger, MCIL is now the largest Chinese newspaper group outside mainland China, Taiwan and Hong Kong.

On 27 June 2009, MCIL clinched the National Mergers and Acquisitions Award 2009 for The Most Innovative Deal of the Year.

== Editorial stance ==
Freedom House regards Sin Chew Daily as "fairly pro-Beijing" and said the newspaper published an article repeating state media narratives. Sin Chew has also published content critical of China, including information compiled from foreign sources.

== Controversies and issues ==
Steven Gan's independent news site Malaysiakini began with a 20 November 1999 story criticizing the practices of Sin Chew Jit Poh. The newspaper had doctored a photograph of Malaysia's ruling party to remove Anwar Ibrahim, who had been imprisoned for corruption. According to BBC News, the Malaysiakini report led to "worldwide infamy" for Sin Chew Jit Poh, and the newspaper later issued a public apology.

On 4 December 2009, Sin Chew Daily has apologised to the Federation of Hainan Association Malaysia president Foo Sae Heng for misquoting him in a news article published.

On 14 May 2018, Sin Chew Daily offered an apology to PKR's Rafizi Ramli over a report claiming he coveted the post of finance minister. Sin Chew Daily posted an explanation on its website admitting an error in its May 13 report claiming Rafizi "advised" PKR president Wan Azizah Wan Ismail to snub a Pakatan Harapan (PH) meeting on Cabinet posts after he was purportedly overlooked for the finance portfolio.

On 15 April 2025, in anticipation of President of China Xi Jinping's state visit to Malaysia, Sin Chew Daily published an illustration of the national flags of China and Malaysia on its front page. The Malaysian flag lacked the crescent representing Islam, Malaysia's official religion, drawing public criticism. The King of Malaysia, Ibrahim Iskandar of Johor, also rebuked the error through a post on Facebook as "unacceptable". Sin Chew Daily has since apologised for the error, rectified it on the newspaper's digital copies, and suspended both chief editor Chan Aun Kuang and deputy chief sub-editor Tsai Shwu San, who were cooperating with the Home Ministry in investigations.

== Hua Zong Literature Award ==
As part of an effort to encourage the Chinese community to develop a love for its culture and language, Sin Chew Daily has instigated a host of cultural events, one of its highlights being the Hua Zong Literature Award (花縱文學獎), established in 1991.

The inaugural literary award was named as the Sin Chew Daily Literature Awards. Renowned Singapore artist Tan Swie Hian created the bronze sculpture "Hua Zong" as a prize for the award winner. Thus the literary award was renamed "Hua Zong" or Floral Trail Literation Awards. Hua (花, huā) means flower, but it also has similar pronunciation to Huá (華) meaning Chinese, this new adopted name bears the significance of connecting worldwide Chinese through literature.

The award has helped foster Chinese literature in Malaysia; a number of Malaysian Chinese writers such as Tei Chiew-Siah and Li Zishu who have made a mark in the literary world has received the Award. The award recognizes excellence in various categories, including fiction, prose and poetry. It also awards an international prize biennially to writers worldwide who write in the Chinese language; recipients include Wang Anyi, Yan Lianke, Yu Kwang-chung and Pai Hsien-yung.

== Other publications in Sin Chew Media Group ==
- Guang Ming Daily 光明日报
- Cahaya Sin Chew 學海
- Sinaran Sin Chew 星星
- Bintang Sin Chew 小星星
- Eye Asia 亞洲眼
- Xing Xing Xue Tang 星星学堂

== See also ==
- Sin Chew Jit Poh, defunct Chinese-language newspaper in Singapore, now merged with Lianhe Zaobao
