= Ming Pao =

Chinese-language newspaper from Hong Kong

Ming Pao 明報
- Type: Daily newspaper
- Format: Broadsheet
- Owner: Media Chinese International
- Publisher: Media Chinese International
- Founded: 20 May 1959; 67 years ago
- Language: Chinese (in Traditional Chinese characters)
- Sister newspapers: Ming Pao Toronto; Ming Pao Vancouver; see Media Chinese International for full list
- Website: www.mingpao.com.hk
- Free online archives: news.mingpao.com

Ming Pao
- Traditional Chinese: 明報
- Simplified Chinese: 明报
- Literal meaning: transparent newspaper
Transcriptions
Standard Mandarin
- Hanyu Pinyin: Míng Bào
- Bopomofo: ㄇㄧㄥˊ ㄅㄠˋ
- Wade–Giles: Ming2 Pao4
- Yale Romanization: Míng Bàu
- IPA: [mǐŋ pâʊ]
Yue: Cantonese
- Yale Romanization: Mìhng Bou
- Jyutping: Ming4 Bou3
- IPA: [mȅŋ pōu]

Ming Pao (Chinese: 明報) is a Chinese-language newspaper published by Media Chinese International in Hong Kong. In a 2022 survey from the Chinese University of Hong Kong sampling 994 local households, Ming Pao was listed as the second most credible paid newspaper in Hong Kong.

In the 1990s, Ming Pao established four overseas branches in North America; each provides independent reporting on local news and collects local advertisements. The last of these branches, the Canadian editions serving the Vancouver and Toronto areas, ended their operations in January 2026.

== History ==
=== Launch, early days ===
Ming Pao was first published on 20 May 1959, and was founded by the famous Chinese Wuxia novelist Louis Cha, known better by his pseudonym Jin Yong, and his friend, Shen Pao Sing (沈寶新).

Daisy Li Yuet-Wah won an International Press Freedom Award from the Committee to Protect Journalists for her work with the paper in 1994.

Before British Hong Kong's handover to the People's Republic of China by the United Kingdom in 1997, Ming Pao was considered hostile to the Chinese authority. After the handover, the controversial editors of Ming Pao turned favorable towards the Chinese government.

=== Merger with Malaysia Sinchew and Nanyang Groups ===
In October 1995, the publisher of Ming Pao, Ming Pao Enterprise was taken over by Tiong Hiew King. On 29 January 2007, Tiong released a proposal to merge the three media groups – Sin Chew Media Corporation Berhad (Malaysia), Nanyang Press Holdings Berhad (Malaysia) and Ming Pao Enterprise Corporation Limited (Hong Kong). The merged group, named Media Chinese International Limited was dual-listed on the main boards of the Stock Exchange of Hong Kong and the Bursa Malaysia Securities Berhad in April 2008. All of the existing groups retain their existing publications and independent operations.

The website of Ming Pao was set up in 1995, one of the earliest newspaper websites in Hong Kong.

Since April 2008, Ming Pao is published by Ming Pao Newspapers Limited, a subsidiary of Media Chinese International Limited.

== International development ==
Ming Pao set up a Toronto office in Canada in May 1993 to publish the Ming Pao Eastern Edition (明報(加東版)), then set up a Vancouver office in October the same year for the Ming Pao Western Edition (明報(加西版)).

In April 1997, the group set up a New York office and started publishing the Ming Pao US East Coast Edition (明報(美東版)). The journal launched in the San Francisco Bay Area in April 2004 with a print run of 25,000, the sixth Chinese newspapers to be distributed in the region. In 2007, the office also published the New York Free Newspaper (紐約免費報).

Ming Pao New York and Ming Pao San Francisco ceased operations on 31 January and 14 February 2009, respectively. The closing of NY operations was a symbol of the weakening of ethnic newspapers of the region. The group merged the resources of Ming Pao New York and the New York Free Newspaper to create Ming Pao Daily Free News (New York) (明報(紐約)免費報), serving the Chinese community along the US East Coast.

On 12 January 2026, it was announced that due to financial difficulties the branches in the Vancouver and Toronto areas would publish their final edition 17 January 2026, with all 60 staff terminated effective January 31, 2026, hence ending all their operations in Canada.

== Controversies ==
=== Accusations of Chinese Communist Party influence ===
A 2001 report on Chinese media censorship by the Jamestown Foundation cited Ming Pao as one of the four major Chinese newspapers in the United States directly or indirectly controlled by Beijing. "Employees at Ming Pao's New York office have told sources that their 'true boss' is none other than the Chinese Consulate [in New York], and that they are obligated to do whatever the Consulate asks," it said.

A 2006 study of Ming Pao editorials noted a tendency toward self-censorship concerning criticism toward Beijing. According to a 2013 report by the Center for International Media Assistance, this came after a number of newspapers, including Ming Pao Daily, were bought by business tycoons with interests in China and close ties to mainland officials before and after the handover of Hong Kong in 1997.

=== Assault on former chief editor Kevin Lau ===
Kevin Lau, who had been chief editor of the journal until January 2014, was attacked in the morning of 26 February 2014 in Sai Wan Ho, Hong Kong. He was seriously injured in a targeted knife attack. It was widely speculated that the attack may have been driven by political motivation, and related to its role in investigation by the International Consortium of Investigative Journalists (ICIJ) into the offshore assets of China's leaders, including relatives of Communist Party general secretary Xi Jinping, former Premier Wen Jiabao, and several members of the National People's Congress Journalists and press of the world saw the attack as an attack on press freedom. Thousands of people, led by leading journalists, attended a rally to denounce violence and intimidation of the media.

During the court hearings of the two suspects, one declared that he was looking to get a $100,000 reward with this attack.

=== Appointment of Chong Tien Siong ===
In 2014, the appointment of new chief editor Chong Tien Siong sparked controversy and internal revolt, due to Siong's close ties to Beijing, and was seen as a major threat to the Chinese-language newspaper's editorial independence.

=== Censorship of 1989 Tiananmen Square protests and massacre ===
Ming Pao was subject to controversy in 2015 after editor-in-chief Chong Tien-siong ordered that a story detailing the 1989 Tiananmen Square protests and massacre be replaced with a story about Chinese Internet giant Alibaba as a "role model for young, would-be entrepreneurs". Chum Shun-kin said the story that was pulled contained details about the history of the massacre, including eyewitness accounts of the killing of civilians and information from diplomatic cables from Canada. The pulling of the Tiananmen story has been criticised by some, including Civic Party lawmaker Claudia Mo who said that Chong appears to "want to shield Beijing from embarrassment, instead of acting in the interests of the public and protecting their right to information".

Hong Kong Journalists Association spokeswoman Shum Yee-lan called on Chong to "communicate" with his own staff.

=== Termination of chief editor Keung Kwok-yuen ===
The journal's executive chief editor, Keung Kwok-yuen (Chinese: 姜國元), was abruptly terminated on 20 April 2016, the same day that a report based on the Panama Papers was published on its front page. Management said that the paper's turnover had been falling in since last year and the Keung had been laid off with immediate effect due to difficult operating conditions. The timing of Keung's removal led to speculation that the Panama Papers report, which connected a number of influential individuals in the territory to tax havens abroad, may have been considered sensitive, thus being the real reason for the dismissal.

Keung had written several weeks earlier about the suppression of Ten Years, a dystopian film about Hong Kong in the year 2025 that was banned in mainland China. Staff and the union publicly denounced editor-in-chief Chong Tien Siong's decision to "punish editorial staff who have different opinions", and questioned the cost reduction pretext as an excuse. Journalists at Ming Pao manifested the concern felt by the media at large, several of them protested by filed blank space reports in an edition the Sunday following the dismissal.

=== Editorials for 2019 anti-extradition bill protests ===
On 13–14 June 2019, Ming Pao published editorials to define the 2019–20 Hong Kong protests as a "riot" (暴動), blaming the violence of the protesters. However, on 14 June, the instant news section of mingpao.com, the web portal of the publisher, published a statement to declare that the editorial represents the newspaper, but not the frontier staff of the publisher. The translator of the editorial refused to translate the article to English as well as any editorials in the future in protest.

On 17 June 2019, Ming Pao published an open letter written by some of its employees criticizing the 13 June editorial for being biased towards the establishment and damaging the reputation of the newspaper.

== See also ==
- Ming Pao Monthly
- Ming Pao Daily News (Canada)
- Newspapers of Hong Kong
- Media of Hong Kong
