= List of newspapers in Malaysia =

This is a list of newspapers published in Malaysia, sorted by language.

== Published newspapers by language ==
=== Malaysian English ===
- New Straits Times – Published and distributed nationwide Malaysian English-language and the oldest daily newspaper for Malaysian Malays, Malaysian Chinese and Tamil Malaysians community. First established and published in Singapore as The Straits Times and Singapore Journal of Commerce on 15 July 1845.
- The Borneo Post – Daily newspaper in Sarawak and Sabah
- Business Times
- Daily Express – Daily newspaper in Sabah
- The Edge
- New Sarawak Tribune – Daily newspaper in Sarawak, re-published in 2010
- The Star – Malaysia's largest and number one published and distributed nationwide Malaysian English-language and the second oldest daily newspaper. First established and published in Georgetown (the state capital of Penang Island) as The Star on 9 September 1971.
- The Sun – Published and distributed nationwide English-language tabloid newspaper.

=== Malaysian Malay ===
- Berita Harian – Published and distributed nationwide Malay-language and the oldest daily newspaper for the Malaysian Malays community. First published based in Singapore as Berita Harian on 1 July 1957.
- Harakah – owned by Pan-Malaysian Islamic Party (PAS).
- Harian Metro – Largest and number one published and distributed nationwide Malaysian Malay-language oldest daily newspaper for the Malaysian Malays adolescence community. First published in Klang Valley and Kuala Lumpur as Harian Metro on 26 March 1991.
- Kosmo! – Malaysia's nationwide Malaysia-language tabloid newspaper.
- Sinar Harian – Nationwide tabloid community newspaper.
- Utusan Borneo – Malay-Iban-language publication in Sarawak and Sabah, published by The Borneo Post.
- Utusan Malaysia – Malaysia's nationwide Malaysia-language tabloid newspaper.
- Utusan Sarawak – Daily news publication in Sarawak.

=== Malaysian Mandarin ===
- China Press (中國報) – Most popular Chinese-language news portal. First established and published in Klang Valley, Greater Kuala Lumpur and Kuala Lumpur on 1 April 1946.
- Guang Ming Daily (光明日報) – Third largest circulation daily newspaper. First established and published based in Georgetown as Sin Pin Jit Poh (星檳日報) on 15 January 1939.
- Kwong Wah Yit Poh – Oldest surviving Chinese-language in Southeast Asia. First established and published in Georgetown in December 1910.
- Nanyang Siang Pau (南洋商報) – Second oldest Chinese-language newspaper. First established and published based in Singapore as Nanyang Siang Pau (南洋商報) on 6 September 1923.
- Sin Chew Daily (星洲日報) – Largest and number one published and distributed nationwide Malaysian Mandarin-language daily newspaper for Malaysian Chinese community. First established and published in Singapore as Sin Chew Jit Poh (星洲日報) on 15 January 1929.
- Oriental Daily News (东方日報) – One of the popular published and distributed nationwide Malaysian Chinese-language daily newspaper. First established and published on 29 September 2002.
- See Hua Daily News (诗华日報) – One of the popular published and distributed Malaysian Chinese-language daily newspaper in Sarawak founded in 1952.

=== Malaysian Tamil ===
- Makkal Osai
- Malaysia Nanban

== Online-only newspapers ==
- Agenda Daily
- Bernama
- The Malaysian Insider – ceased publications in March 2016
- The Malaysian Insight – ceased publications in October 2024
- Malaysiakini
- Free Malaysia Today
- Malaysian.News
- MalaysiaNow
- Malay Mail
- The Rakyat Post
- Scoop
- PP Health Malaysia (PPHM)

== Defunct newspapers ==
- New Sabah Times – English, Malay, and Kadazan-Dusun daily in Sabah, ceased publication on 31 December 2020
- Sarawak Tribune – suspended in 2006, but has since been relaunched as the New Sarawak Tribune in 2010.
- Shin Min Daily News – Malaysia's first Chinese-language tabloid newspaper; publication ceased in 1994
- Sunday Mail – replaced by the Weekend Mail
- Tamil Nesan (தமிழ் நேசன்) – ceased publication on 1 February 2019
- Warta Negara – North Malaysia Jawi script; ceased publication in 1969
- Weekend Mail – successor of the Sunday Mail, but was indefinitely suspended in 2006
- Utusan Melayu (Jawi script) – now a weekly newspaper and incorporating with Utusan Malaysia, ceased publication on 10 October 2019
