= Culture of Sarawak =

Culture of Sarawak exhibits notable diversity in ethnicity, cuisine, and language. The Sarawakian culture has been influenced by Bruneian Malays of the coastal areas. Substantial cultural influences also came from the Chinese and British cultures.

Interracial marriages, formerly rare or between closely related tribes, are increasingly common.

== Indigenous cultures ==
Iban's are considered proto-Malays, however their culture has been unaffected by Islamic culture. While many communities have converted to Christianity, some continue to follow indigenous beliefs. Customary practices, including jural rules, rituals, and social customs, are collectively known as adat and remain important for Ibans. It differs from the Malay adat in that it is entwined with traditional religious beliefs, and in that some of it can be carried out through law.

The Iban longhouse functions as a community, each holding several families (over 50 in some cases) related through blood and marriage. A communal corridor (the ruai) runs through the building, and is the location of communal activities, such as work, socialising, celebrating, and discussing community matters. Each Iban longhouse has a head (tuai rumah), determined by community vote upon the death of their predecessor, who acts as a leader and an arbitrator. The tuai rumah reports to the penghulu, who leads several longhouses. In the modern era, the tuai rumah is also responsible for implementing government policies in these communities. Headhunting was once an important tradition for the Ibans, with Sarawak once nicknamed the "Land of the Headhunters". It was part of a heroic warrior code where tribal prestige was determined by its capacity for warfare. The custom is no longer observed, after being made illegal shortly after the Second World War.

The closely related Lun Bawang and Kelabit tribes have undergone significant cultural change due to conversion to Christianity, affecting their religious and ethnic identities. Each village now has a church, which has taken over the social and community functions previously associated with the longhouse. The Penan people were one of the last remaining indigenous groups. While a minority retain traditional nomadic ways, most have settled down and adopted modern clothing, with less attention paid to traditional hairstyles, dangling earlobe modification, and traditional rattan bangles.

== Attractions and recreational spots ==
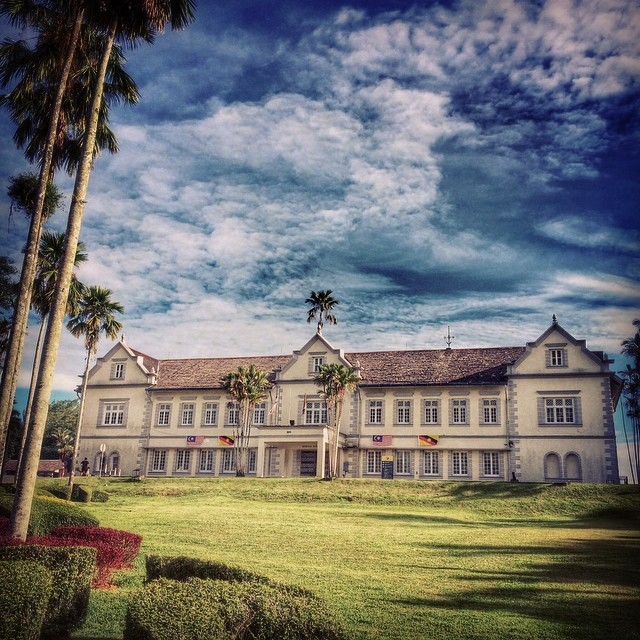
The Sarawak State Museum

Sarawak Cultural Village is located at the foot of Mount Santubong, Kuching. Known as the "living museum", it showcases the various ethnic groups carrying out traditional activities in their respective traditional houses. Cultural performances are presented here. The Sarawak State Museum houses a collection of artefacts such as pottery, textiles, and woodcarving tools from various ethnic tribes in Sarawak, as well as ethnographic materials of local cultures. The museum building preserves its French architecture. Other museums include the Islamic Heritage Museum, Petroleum Museum, Chinese History Museum, Kuching Cat Museum, Textile Museum Sarawak, Art Museum, Lau King Howe Hospital Memorial Museum, and Baram Regional Museum. There is a series of well-preserved forts in Sarawak built during the Brooke regime such as Fort Margherita, Fort Emma, Fort Sylvia, and Fort Alice.

The Batang Ai Resort and Bawang Assan Iban longhouses allow the visiting guests to have an overnight stay and to participate in traditional Iban daily activities. Other longhouses include: Iban longhouses in Kapit, Bidayuh longhouses in Kuching, Kelabit longhouses in Bario, Lun Bawang longhouses in Ba'kelalan, and Melanau wooden houses in Sibu. Main Bazaar and Carpenter Street are the two notable streets in Chinatown, Kuching. India Street in Kuching is notable for its textile products. An Indian–Muslim mosque can be found in the vicinity.

Traditional houses in Sarawak

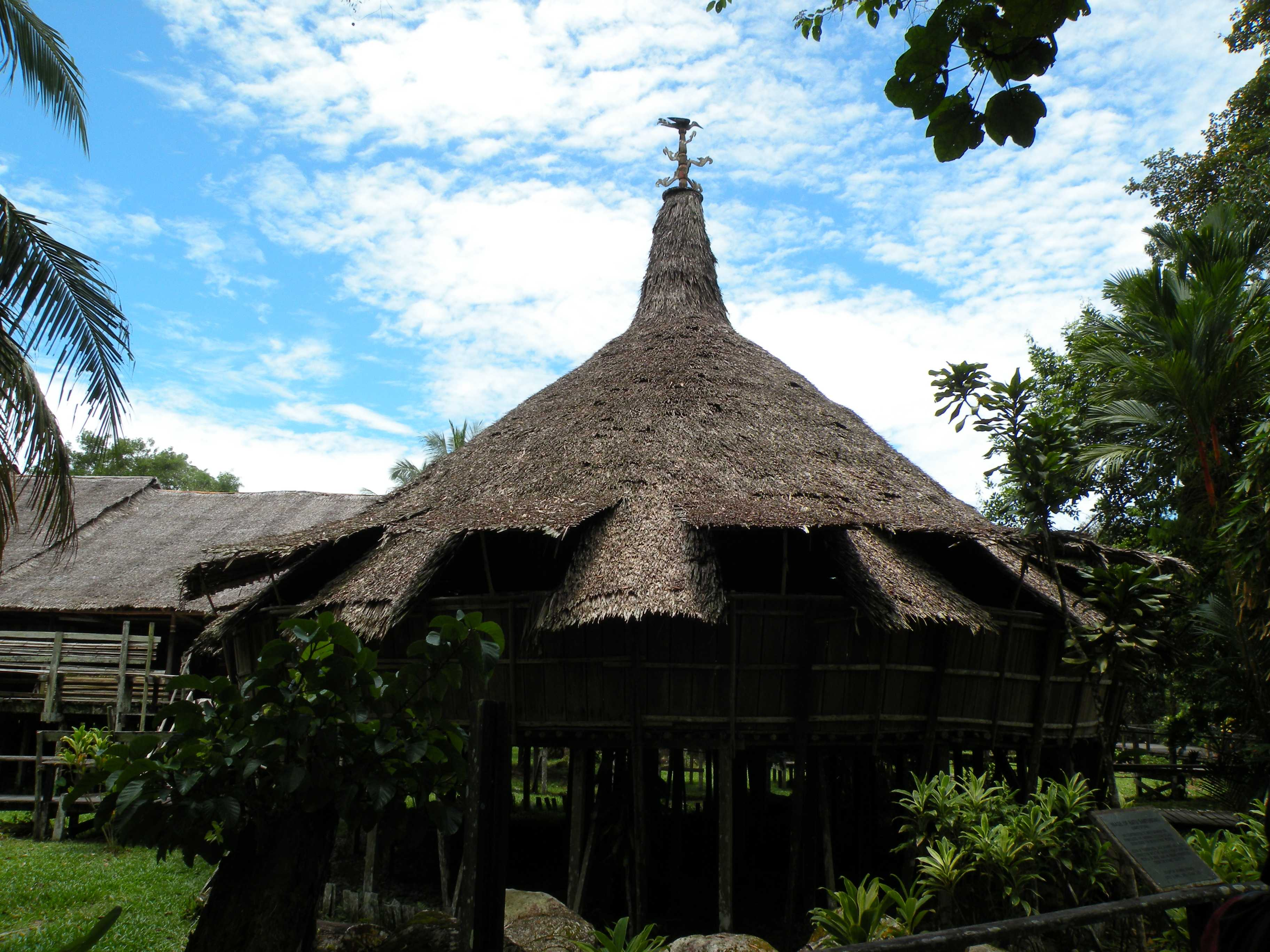
Bidayuh house

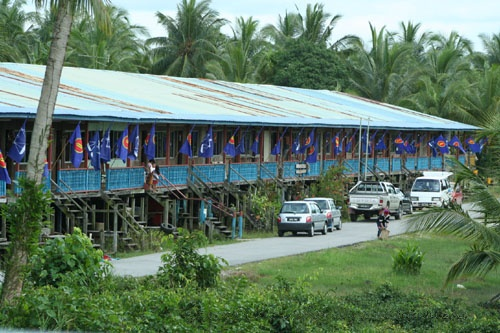
Iban longhouse

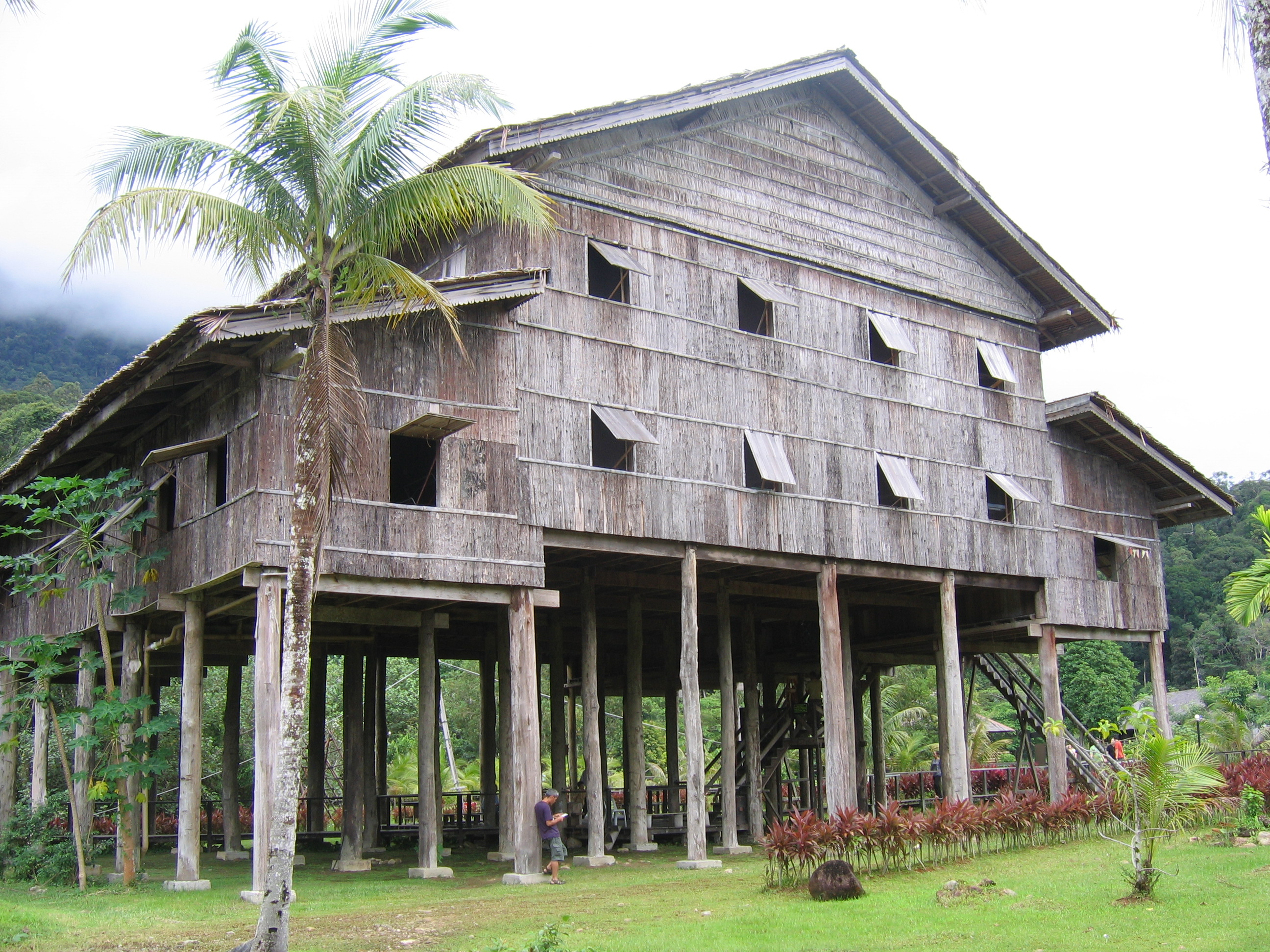
Melanau house

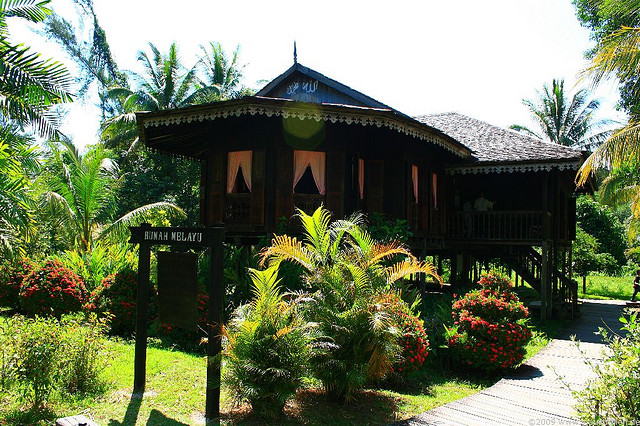
Sarawak Malay house

== Fine arts and crafts ==
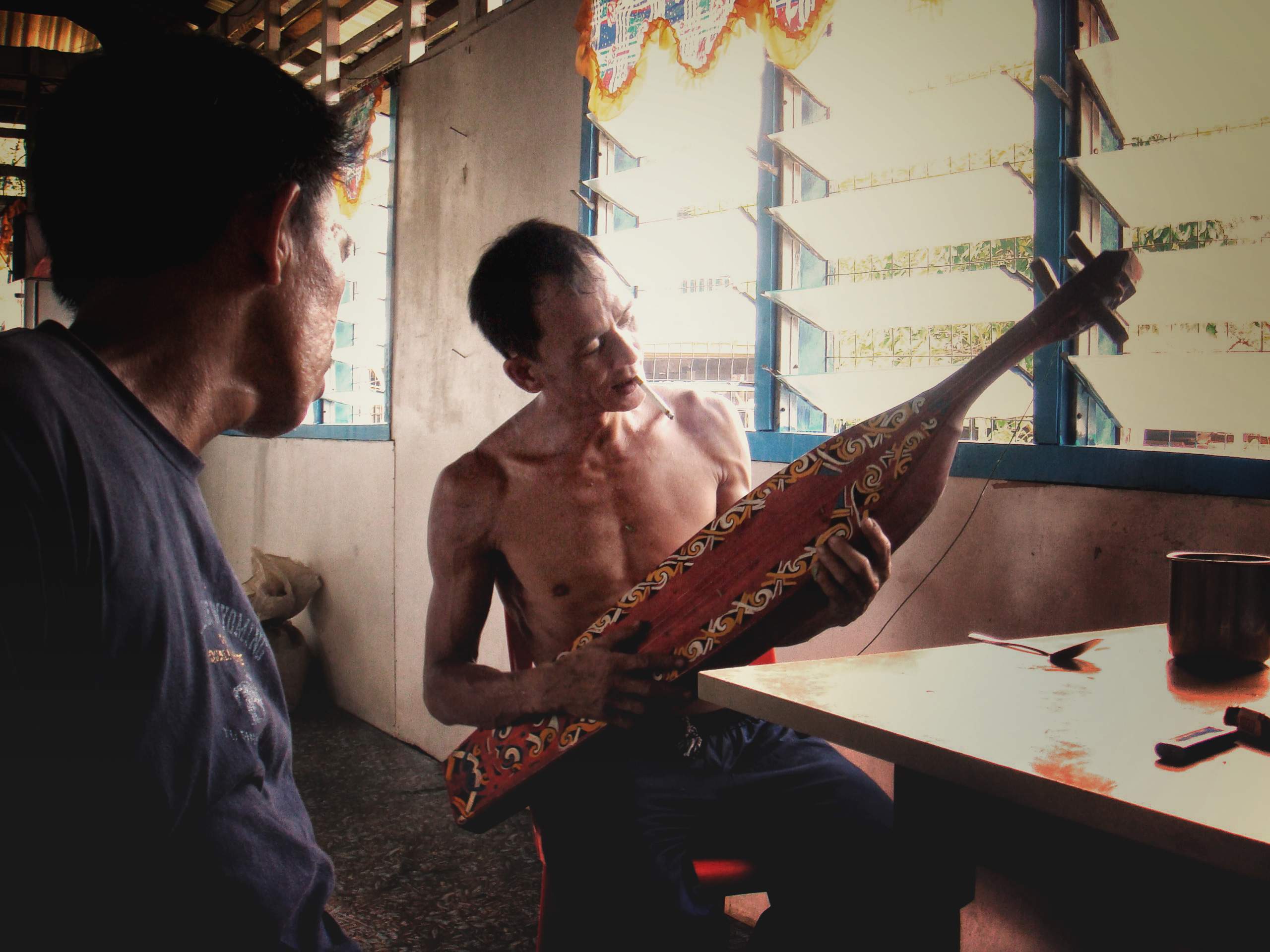
A Kayan tribesman, playing the Sapeh

The Sarawak Craft Council popularises local ethnic crafts. The Sarakraf Pavilion houses a workshop which demonstrates a wide range of craft-making skills. Well-known handicrafts in Sarawak include Orang Ulu beadwork, Iban Pua Kumbu, Bidayuh Kesah mats and Tambok baskets, Malay Kain Songket, ethnic headgear, and Chinese pottery. Sarawak Artists Society was established in 1985 to promote local cultures and arts in the form of paintings. Most artists in the post-war Sarawak prefers scenery and nature, traditional dances, and traditional daily activities as their drawing themes.

Orang Ulu's Sapeh (a dug-out guitar) is the best known traditional musical instrument in Sarawak. It was played for Queen Elizabeth II during her official visit to Sarawak in 1972. Other traditional musical instruments are various types of gongs and Kulintang, idiophones, bamboo flutes and zithers.

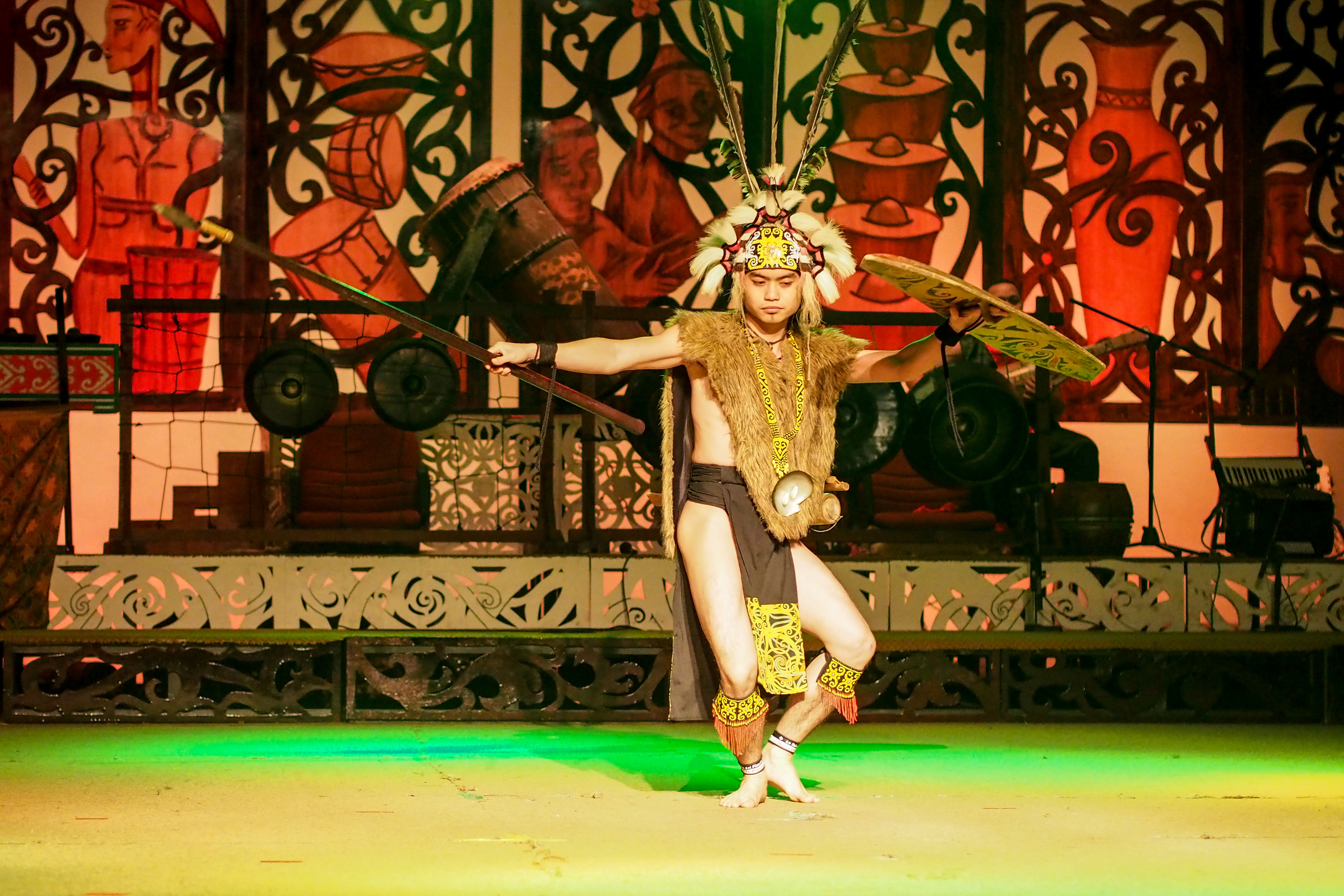
Ngajat, the Iban warrior dance gazetted as part of Sarawak culture

The oral tradition has been part of the culture of the various indigenous groups in Sarawak for generations. It is used for passing on life lessons, traditions, and values to the younger generation. The stories are told repeatedly by the elders to the younger ones, such as in storytelling sessions on special occasions and through traditional performances. (Note: Pandian, 2014. it became the primary means of passing culture, history, and valued traditions. ... in the fact that oral literature is actualised only in performances; (page 95)) Some of these traditional practices are the Iban's Ngajat dances, Renong (Iban vocal repertory), Ensera (Iban oral narratives), (Note: Postill, 2006. ... four were oral narratives ... (page 51)) and epic storytelling by the Kayan and Kenyah. The Borneo Literature Bureau existed from 1958 until 1977; it encouraged the documentation of local cultures, local authors, and publications in English, Chinese, Malay, Iban and other native languages. The Bureau was replaced by the Dewan Bahasa dan Pustaka (DBP) in 1977, which advocated publication only in the Malay language. (Note: Postill, 2006. ;... to encourage local authorship and meet local needs ... (page 51) ... The Bureau ceased to exist in 1977 when it was taken over by the federal body Dewan Bahasa dan Pustaka.(page 55) ... He concludes that DBP cannot publish books in regional languages (pages 59 and 60)) Documentation of oral traditions has also been done by the Universiti Malaysia Sarawak (UNIMAS) and the Sarawak Customs Council. (Note: Pandian, 2014. carried out by the Institute of East Asian Studies at Universiti Malaysia Sarawak (UNIMAS),(page 96) ... Sarawak Customs Council has documented ... (page 97)) The Sarawak Gazette was first published by the Brooke government in 1870. It recorded a variety of news in Sarawak related to economics, agriculture, anthropology, and archaeology. The Gazette is still being published today. Hikayat Panglima Nikosa (Story of Nikosa the Warrior), printed in 1876 at Kuching, is one of the earliest text publications in Borneo. It is also the first novel from Malaysia. Indigenous traditions have become a source of writing inspiration for Sarawak Chinese authors.

== Cuisine ==
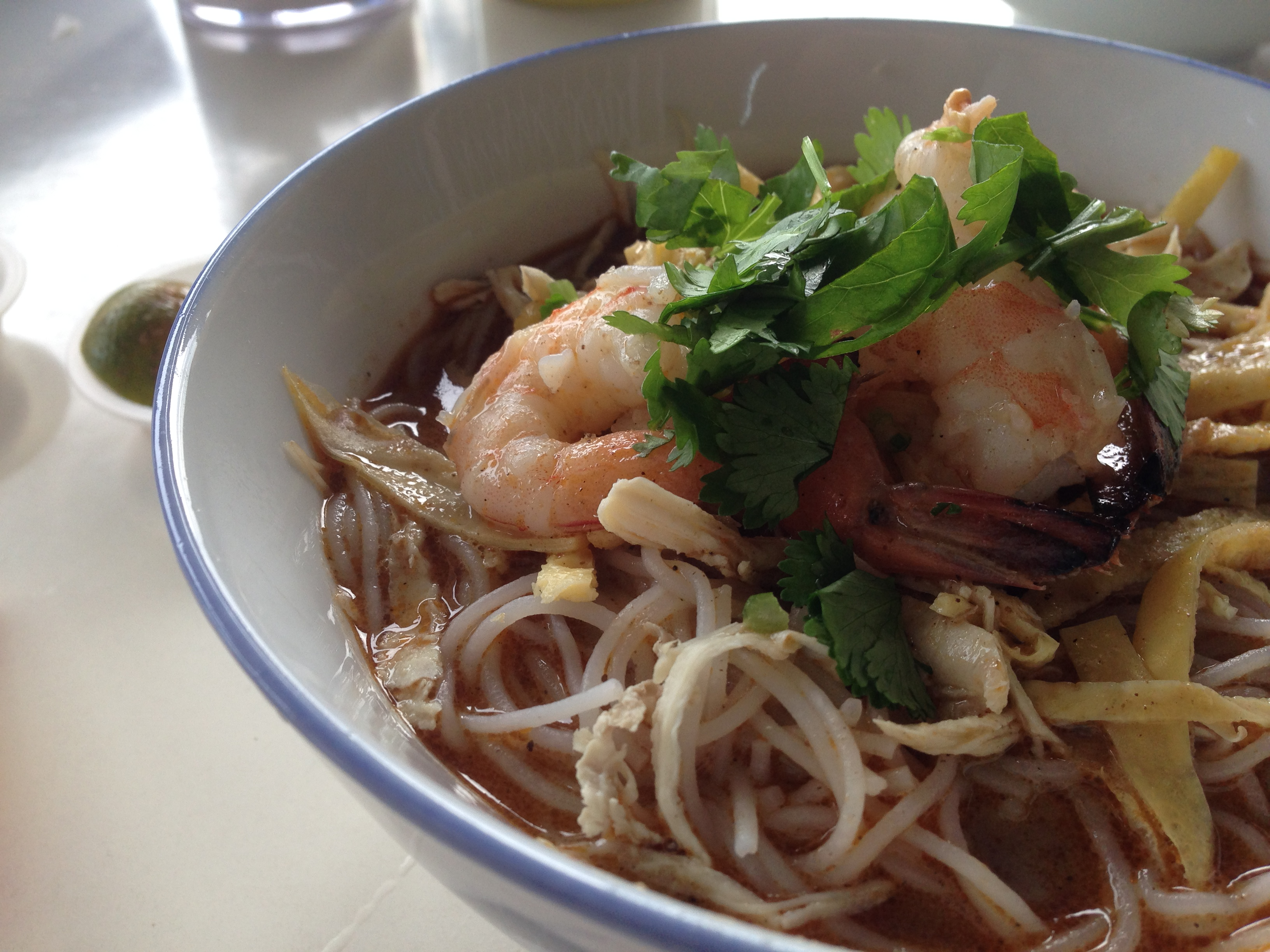
A bowl of Sarawak laksa

Notable dishes in the state include Sarawak laksa, kolo mee, and ayam pansuh. The state is also known for its Sarawak layer cake dessert. Each ethnic group has its own delicacies with different styles of preparing, cooking, and eating food. However, modern technology has altered the way of cooking for native dishes. Examples of ethnic foods are the Iban tuak (rice wine), Melanau tebaloi (sago palm crackers) and umai (raw fish mixed with lime juice), and Orang Ulu urum giruq (pudding). The traditional food of Sarawak has been marketed as a culinary tourism product. Examples of locally grown franchise stores in Sarawak are Sugar Bun, Singapore Chicken Rice, and Bing Coffee. Other international foods such as Western food, Indonesian food, Indian food, and Middle Eastern food can also be found there.

== Media ==
The Sarawak government is popularly believed to exert its influence over the media. (Note: Postill, 2006. ... the government controls virtually all newspapers in Sarawak (page 76)) Examples of newspapers based in Sarawak are Sin Chew Daily, See Hua Daily News, Borneo Post, and Utusan Borneo. In the 1990s, major newspapers negatively portrayed the timber blockades in Sarawak as detrimental to the state's growth and development. (Note: Postill, 2006. ... development had been hindered by 'two groups of people, (page 78)) The Sarawak Tribune was indefinitely suspended in 2006 for publishing a caricature of Muhammad. The daily was rebooted as the New Sarawak Tribune in 2010. Radio Sarawak existed from 1954 to 1976. It was broadcast in Malay, Iban, Chinese, and English. (Note: Postill, 2006. Radio Sarawak was officially inaugurated ... (page 46 and 47)) Some Sarawak-based radio stations are Sarawak FM, cats FM and TEA FM. In 2010, Clare Rewcastle Brown, sister-in-law of former British prime minister Gordon Brown, set up a Sarawak Report website and a London-based short-wave radio station named Radio Free Sarawak to provide alternative news and views free from the influence of the Sarawak government.

Sarawak become the first region in Malaysia to own its TV station, when it launched TV Sarawak on 10 October 2020, albeit not the first time as back in the April 1998, NTV7 was launched by Sarawakian businessman, Mohd Effendi Norwawi under the entity of Natseven TV Sdn Bhd, before acquired by Media Prima Berhad in 2005. It's currently available in Astro and myFreeview and available in 4 languages: Malay, English, Iban and Chinese (Mandarin). The launching of TV station aimed to overcome the low priority and coverage of Peninsular-based media and to solidify the representation of Sarawak, and generally of East Malaysia.

== Holidays and festivals ==
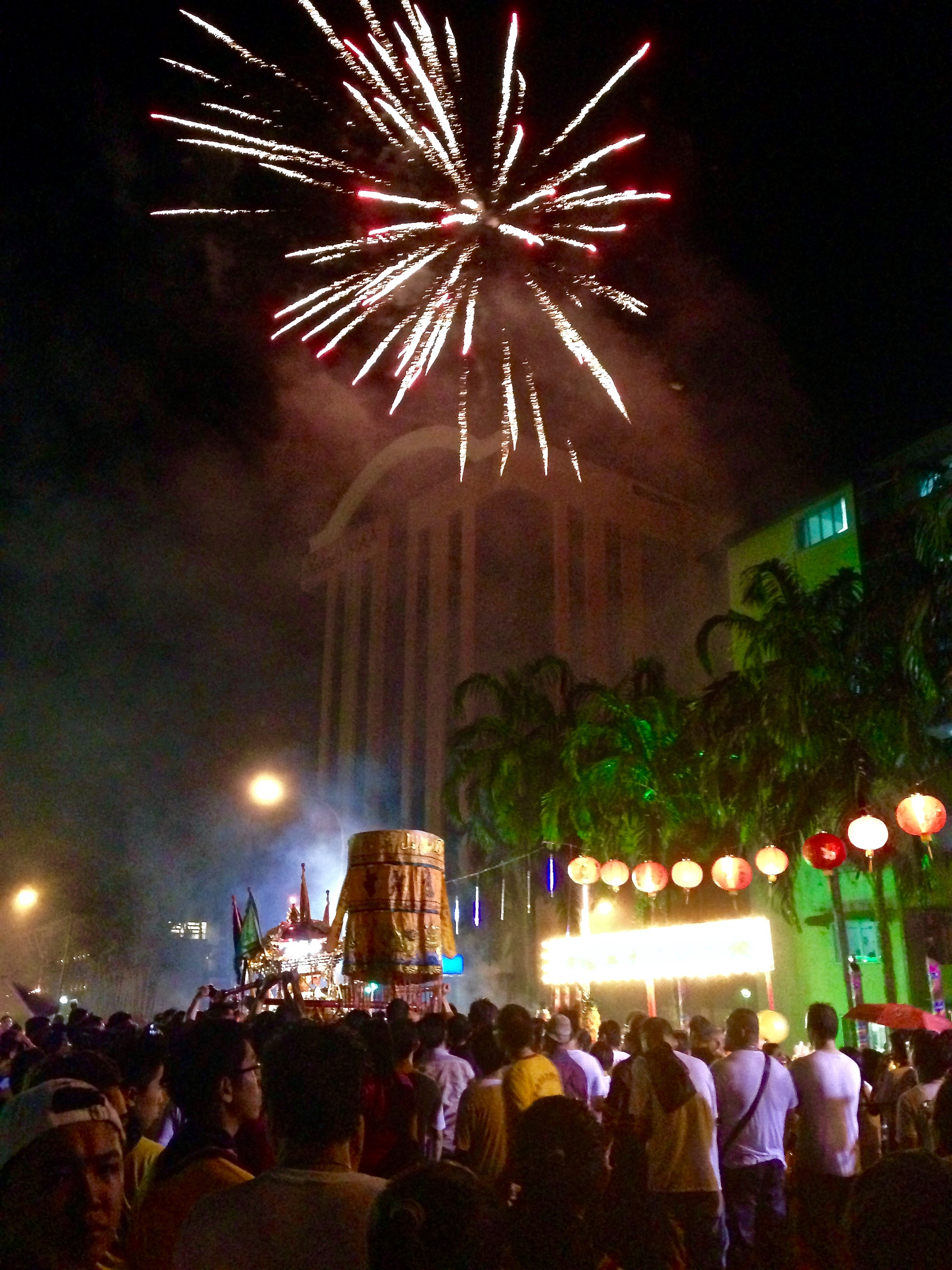
Sarawakians celebrating festival with a fireworks display

Sarawakians observe a number of holidays and festivals throughout the year. Apart from national Hari Merdeka and Malaysia Day celebrations, the state also celebrates Sarawak Self-government Day on 22 July and the State Governor's birthday. Ethnic groups also celebrate their own festivals. The open house tradition allows other ethnic groups to join in the celebrations. Sarawak is the only state in Malaysia to declare the Gawai Dayak celebration a public holiday. It is also the only state in Malaysia that does not gazette the Deepavali celebration as a public holiday. Religious groups are free to hold processions in major towns and cities during festivals. Sarawak and Sabah are the only two states in Malaysia that declare Good Friday a public holiday. The Kuching Festival is a month-long celebration that is held every August to commemorate its elevation to city status in 1988. Miri City Day is held in conjunction with Miri May Fest every year.

== Sports ==
Sarawak sent its own teams to participate in the 1958 and 1962 British Empire and Commonwealth Games, and 1962 Asian Games before its athletes started representing Malaysia after 1963. The Sarawak State Sports Council was formed in 1985 to raise the standard of sports in Sarawak. Sarawak was the host of the Malaysian SUKMA Games in 1990 and 2016. The state was the overall champion in the 1990, 1992, and 1994 SUKMA games. Sarawakians have represented Malaysia in the Southeast Asian Games. The state also sent athletes to participate in the Special Olympics World Games. Sarawak emerged as the overall champion for 11 consecutive years at the Malaysia Para Games beginning in 1994. There are several stadiums in Sarawak: Sarawak Stadium, Sarawak State Stadium, Stadium Perpaduan (Unity Stadium), and Sarawak State Hockey Stadium. The Sarawak FA football association was founded in 1974. It won the Malaysia FA Cup in 1992 and the Malaysia Premier League in 1997 and 2013.

== See also ==
- Culture of Malaysia
