= Audit Bureau of Circulations Malaysia =

Audit Bureau of Circulation Malaysia
- Abbreviation: ABCM
- Formation: 1975
- Dissolved: 2019
- Type: Non-Governmental Organization
- Headquarters: Unit 706, Block B, Pusat Dagangan Phileo Damansara 1, 9 Jalan 16/11, 46350, Petaling Jaya, Selangor Darul Ehsan, Malaysia.
- Services: Provides independently verified and audited physical and digital circulation data.
- Chairman: Foong Ai Peng
- Affiliations: Malaysian Advertisers Association; Association of Accredited Advertising Agents Malaysia; Malaysia Digital Association
- Website: https://abcm.org.my/

The Audit Bureau of Circulations Malaysia (ABCM) was a self-regulating independent organization that provides audited physical and digital publication circulation data in Malaysia.

Founded in 1975, the organization is funded primarily by participating newspaper organization that pays a membership fee. ABCM shut down in 2019 due to declining physical publication sales and dwindling membership.

== History ==
=== Founding ===
Audit Bureau of Circulations Malaysia (ABCM) was founded in 1975 with the primary focus of auditing and verifying participating organizations' circulation data and other relevant information to advertisers.

=== 2000s - 2019 ===
On 12 October 2010, due to the rise of digital publication and the arising need for digital viewership data, the Malaysian Digital Association was formed. To measure the online viewership, Malaysian Digital Association (MDA) collaborated with ABCM, Media Specialists Association, the Malaysian Advertisers Association, and the Association of Accredited Advertising Agents of Malaysia to appoint Effective Measure as the primary digital audience viewership provider in Malaysia. In addition, MDA announced that all data provided by Effective Measure will be independently verified by ABCM to ensure that the data conforms to industry standards.

On 6 August 2015, to celebrate the ABCM's 40th anniversary, they hosted a golf tournament at Bukit Jalil Golf and Country Resort.

On 19 June 2017, Foong Ai Peng was appointed as its latest chairman.

On 9 September 2019, due to the declining physical publication sales in Malaysia, major news publications such as The Star, Sin Chew Daily, and China Press informed ABCM that they would be withdrawing from the organization.

By the end of 2019, Audit Bureau of Circulations announced their closure, marking the end of independently verified physical publication circulation data in Malaysia. Digital publication circulation data was not affected because it was handled by the Malaysian Digital Association.

== Services ==
Audit Bureau of Circulations served as the sole independently verified and audited physical and digital circulation data in Malaysia.

== Members ==
- Guang Ming Daily
- New Sabah Times
- New Straits Times
- Sin Chew Daily
- The Edge
- The Star
- The Sun
- The Borneo Post
- Utusan Malaysia

== See also ==
- Audit Bureau of Circulations
- Audit Bureau of Circulations (UK)
- Audit Bureau of Circulations (India)
- Audit Bureau of Circulations (North America)
