= Tam Kan =

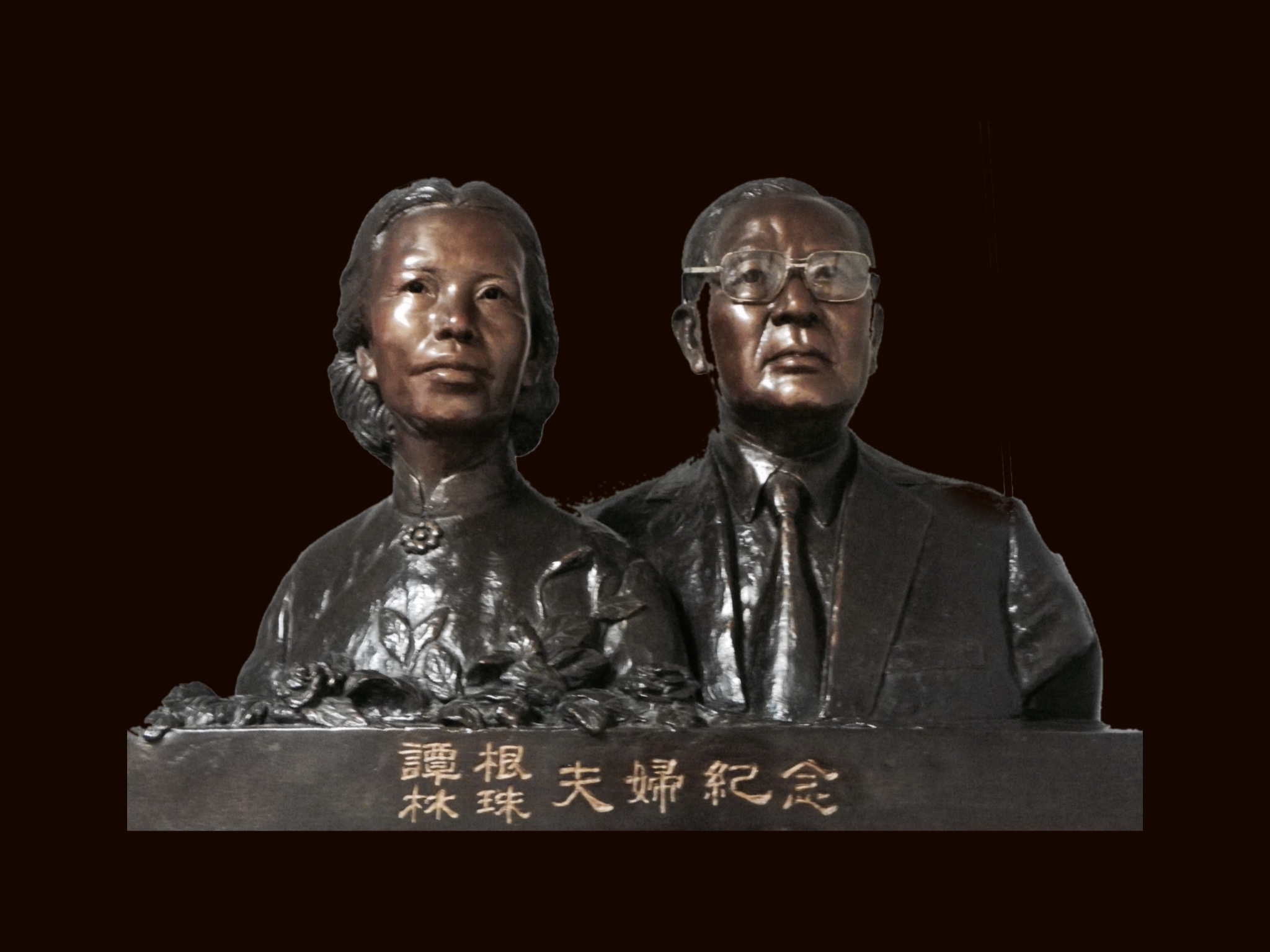
Statue of Tam Kan and Lam Chee

Tam Kan (Chinese: 谭根; pinyin: Tán Gēn; 18 December 1917 – 10 June 2001) was born in Xinhui (新会), a city district in the city of Jiangmen in the province of Guangdong in southern China. He is the second son of Tam See Chow's second marriage to Wun Li King. Although Tam See Chow was a rich and high-ranking official, Tam Kan went through hardship since the age of three when his father died. He learnt carpentry and worked to support his mother, and went through the hardship of surviving WW2. He was one of many workers that participated in the construction of many building structures in Guangzhou including Haizhu Bridge (海珠桥), National Sun Yat-sen University Library (国立中山图书馆), and Guangzhou Baiyun International Airport (白云机场). He later went to Hong Kong and worked for the Asiatic Petroleum Company (香港亚细亚油公司) and the British North Borneo Company. In 1951, Tam Kan was one of the early batch of workers selected by the British North Borneo Company to move from China to North Borneo (now called Sabah).(1)

During the 50s, Tam Kan worked as a foreman at the British North Borneo Company in Sabah, where he contributed and witnessed the early development of North Borneo. He oversaw many constructions of the early buildings and landmarks in Sabah, including the Standard Chartered Bank building (opposite Suria Sabah) and The Hong Kong and Shanghai Banking Corporation (HSBC) building, many of which still exists in Sabah today. He later established his own company 'Tam Kan Contractors Company' (谭根建设公司) in 1958 in Jesselton, North Borneo, now known as Kota Kinabalu, the capital of Sabah after gaining independence from the British empire.

After North Borneo attained self-government on 31 August 1963, Tam Kan became one of the first to establish a foothold in the booming construction industry. The company went on to build many iconic buildings in the state of Sabah, including the Sacred Heart Cathedral, Kota Kinabalu; Segaliud Bridge; Teachers' Training College; 100 Police Flats in Kepayan; Police Flats in Tanjung Aru, shop houses and many more. Although many still exist today, some have either been demolished or are in the state of being demolished, such as ‘Tam Kan Flats’, as reported in 2015 by Malaysian media. (2)(3)(4)(5)

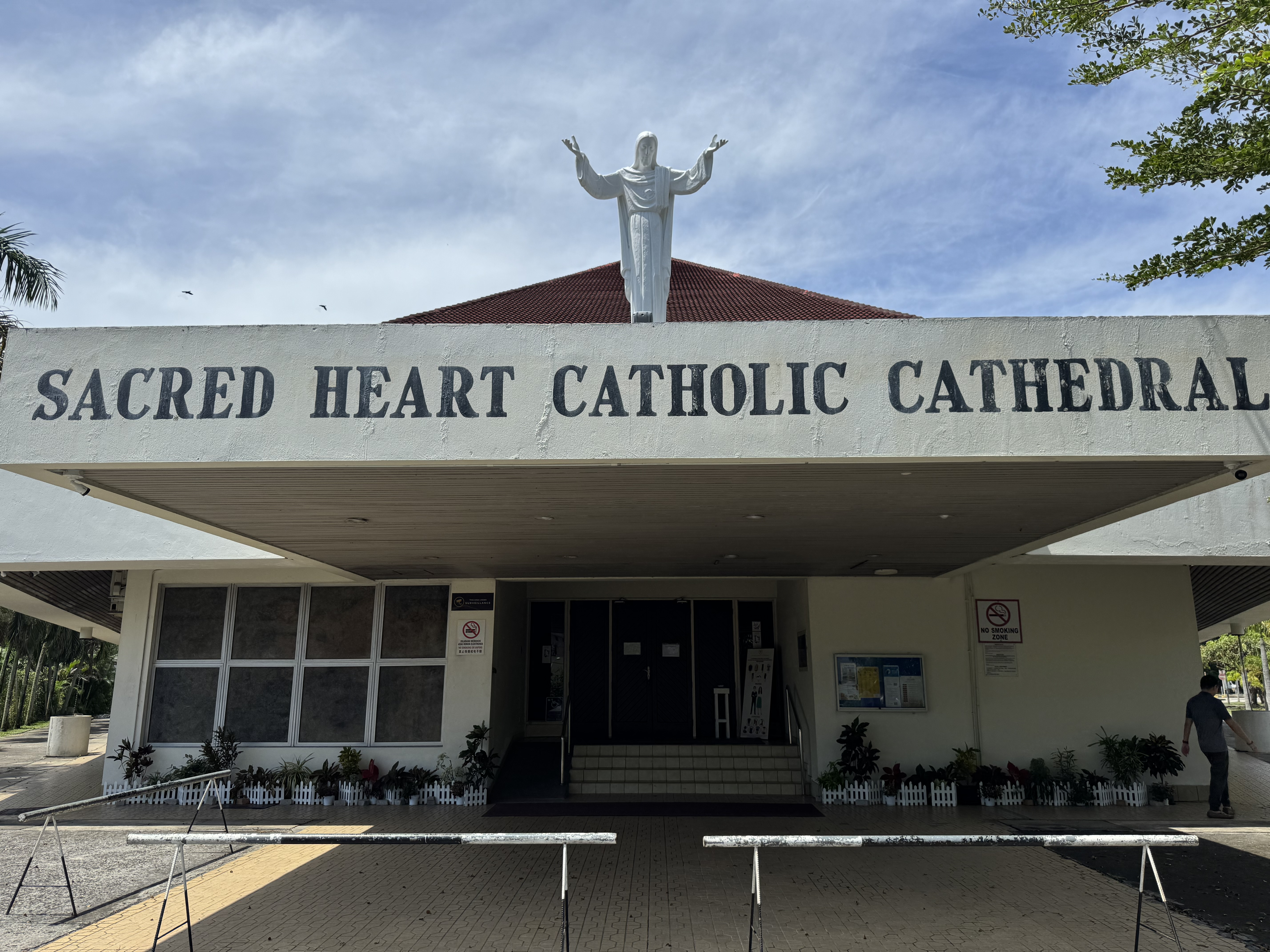
Sacred Heart Catholic Cathedral

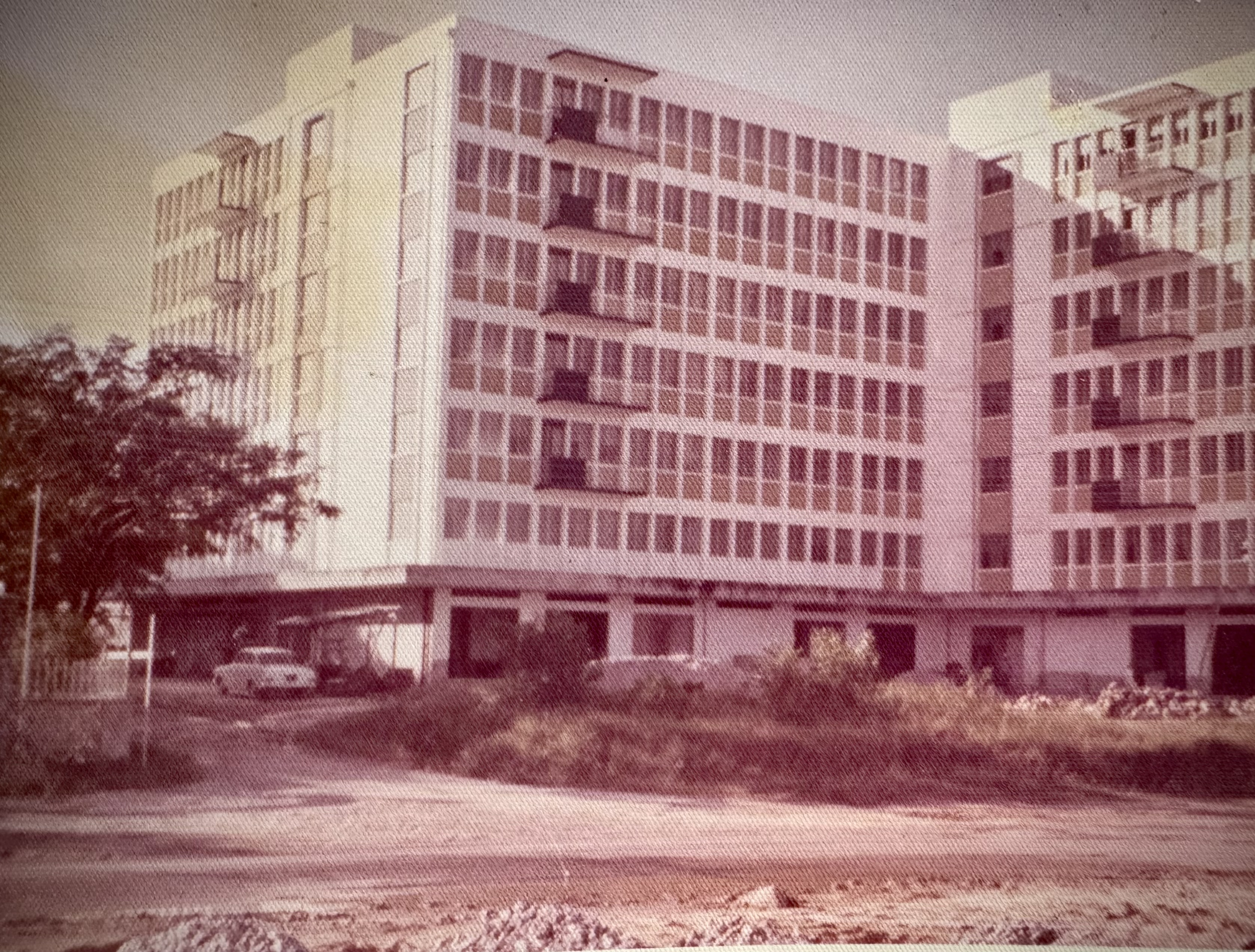

Tam Kan also constructed, owned and operated the Winner Hotel, one of only two tallest buildings in Kota Kinabalu in the 60s. His residence at 5 1/2 mile Tuaran Road was a unique building designed by himself in the 60s, and is believed to be the first private residential address with a full sized water fountain.

Tam Kan was also the founding President of the West Coast Sze Yi Association (四邑公會), where he initiated the funding and construction of the eight-storey Sze Yi building in Bundusan Commercial Centre in Kota Kinabalu. He was president from 1986-1989 and an honorary president (永久名誉会长) after 1989. The Association established an education loan scheme for the good of members' children in 2015, continuing Tam Kan's belief that all children should receive an education. (6)

His many contributions to Sabah, formally known as North Borneo, was recognized by the Head of State, and he was conferred the titles 'BSK' and 'ASDK' in the 70s and 80s respectively for outstanding services to Sabah Malaysia (see Wikipedia under Orders, decorations, and medals of Malaysia for more info). The Sabah government has also named a street after Tam Kan, Lorong Tam Kan, to honour his contributions to the city of Kota Kinabalu.

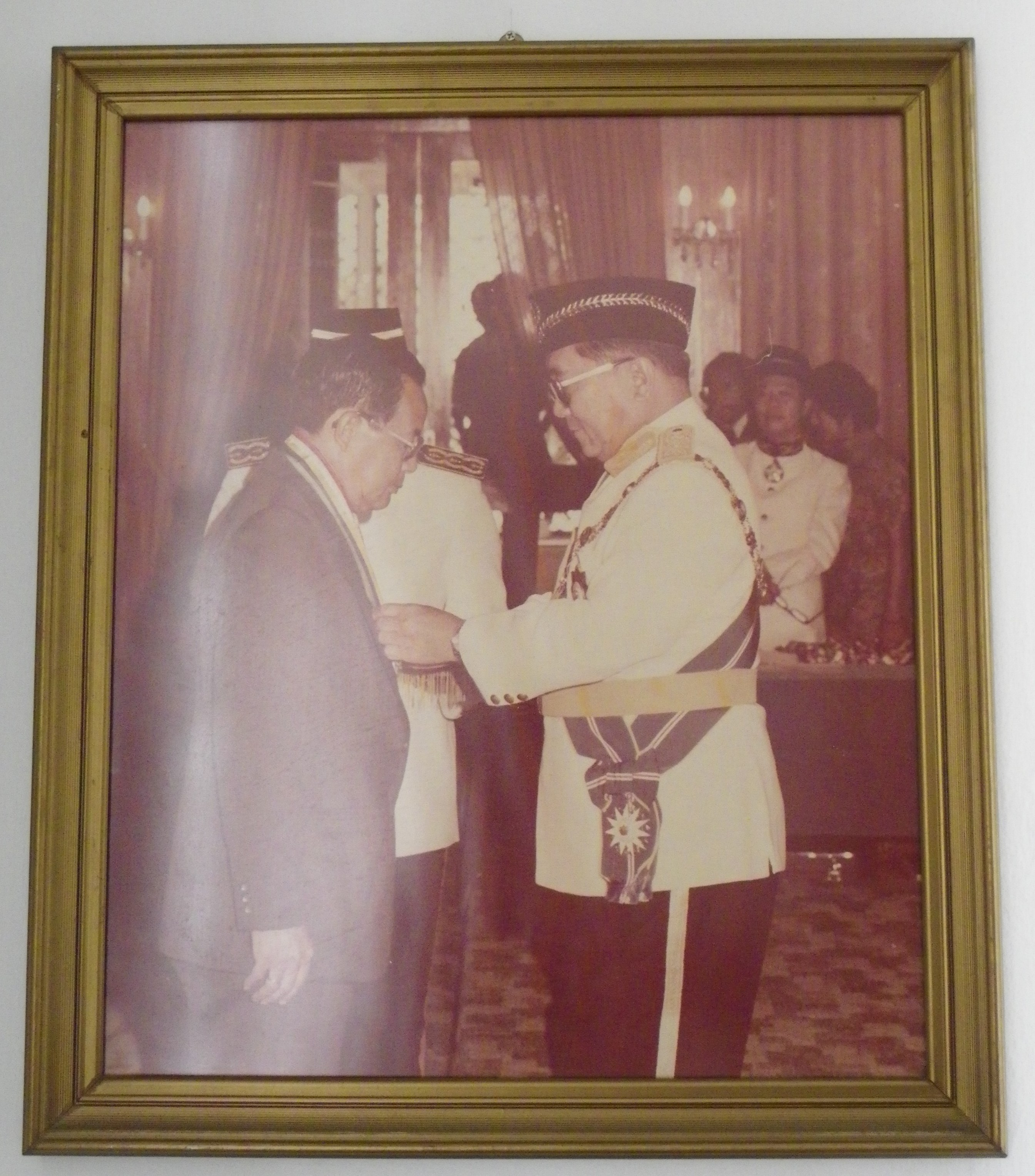
Title Given by Head of State

Tam Kan was a philanthropist who worked tirelessly to help the less fortunate. He was particularly keen in promoting education and sponsoring children in attaining formal education, both locally and overseas, as he himself was deprived of an education. He donated generously during his life to the running and building of schools and libraries in Malaysia and in China.

Tam Kan has never forgotten his roots, and was actively involved and contributed in the development of Xinhui. He was given a special award (振兴新会贡献奖) for the contribution and promotion of the city by the Xinhui City Government and is in the list of outstanding overseas Chinese originated from the city. (7)(8)(9)

Tam Kan died on 10 June 2001 in Kota Kinabalu, Malaysia, at the age of 84, having suffered from ill health for a number of years.

Tam Kan married Lam Chee (Chinese: 林珠, 26 April 1922 - 24 January 2012) on 28 October 1942 and has four sons and three daughters.

Tam Kan Contractors Company is no longer active in the Malaysian construction industry.

== Sources/Links ==
1. Chinese Government webpages on The History of Overseas Xinhui Chinese (新会华侨华人史话): http://www.gd-info.gov.cn/books/dtree/showSJBookContent.jsp?bookId=16916&partId=98&artId=81424
2. Malaysian Chinese Association (Link: http://www.mca.org.my/en/tam-kan-flats-in-inanam-to-be-demolished/)
3. The Borneo Post (Link: https://www.propertyhunter.com.my/news.php?id=1577),
4. New Sabah Times (Link: http://www.newsabahtimes.com.my/nstweb/fullstory/87229),
5. Kinabalu Today (Link: http://www.kinabalutoday.com/index.php/home-2/local-news/7490-sell-off-abandoned-tam-kan-flats-rather-than-rebuilding-it-suggests-lawmaker)
6. Daily Express (Malaysia) online newspaper of East Malaysia published on 6 July 2015. Link=http://www.dailyexpress.com.my/news.cfm?NewsID=101248)
7. Chinese Government webpages on The History of Overseas Xinhui Chinese (新会华侨华人史话) : http://www.gd-info.gov.cn/books/dtree/showSJBookContent.jsp?bookId=16916&partId=129&artId=81424
8. Chinese Government webpages on The History of Overseas Xinhui Chinese (新会华侨华人史话): http://www.gd-info.gov.cn/books/dtree/showSJBookContent.jsp?bookId=16916&partId=124&artId=81424
9. Chinese Government webpages on The History of Overseas Xinhui Chinese (新会华侨华人史话) : http://www.gd-info.gov.cn/books/dtree/showSJBookContent.jsp?bookId=16916&partId=98&artId=81424
