= Michiru (film) =

- Premier poster
- Japanese: ミチル
- Directed by: Louis Muk
- Written by: Louis Muk; Jojo Goh
- Edited by: Anny Chok; Kimberley Sie; Tiffany Sii; Ivy Tang; Melisa Lai; Sherry Shu; Zoe Chin
- Music by: Johnny Koo
- Production company: Isekai Zero
- Distributed by: ARx Media Sdn. Bhd.
- Release date: 12 September 2026 (Malaysia)
- Running time: 30 minutes
- Country: Malaysia
- Language: English

Michiru (ミチル) is Malaysia's first artificial intelligence (AI) animated short film, produced by "Isekai Zero", a brand under ARx Media Sdn. Bhd., an artificial intelligence company based in Sarawak, Malaysia. The film premiered at Golden Screen Cinemas on 12 September 2026 and on YouTube on 16 September 2026.

Michiru follows the coming-of-age story of a secondary school girl named Michiru. Set in various locations around Kuching, Sarawak, Malaysia, the film portrays her adolescence's daily life, growth experiences, and emotional changes from the perspectives of different places and settings.

== Plot ==
Michiru, a Form Five student at a national-type secondary school in Sarawak, Malaysia, is frequently bullied by her classmates, including Matthew, Vera, and Sharon, and has difficulty concentrating in class. She is interested in writing romantic fantasy novels and records her stories in a notebook. One day during class, Michiru's teacher discovers her notebook and reads its contents aloud in front of the class, prompting Matthew and the other students mock her as a "thirsty girl". Unable to endure the public humiliation, Michiru hides in the school library and cries.

Ethan, a transfer student who joined Michiru's class four month ago, learns about the incident and draws his own depiction of "Michiru the Witch" in her notebook to comfort her. Later, the two begin creating stories together in a new notebook, with Michiru writing the stories while Ethan illustrates them. They gradually become close friends.

As Michiru and Ethan spend more time together, they explore various places and attractions around Kuching and Bau, Sarawak, and discover interesting things in their surroundings. Michiru gradually overcomes her lack of interest in attending classes, and her free time becomes more fulfilling and meaningful. Later, Michiru's teacher appoints both of them as hall monitors to help maintain order at school. As they spend more time together, Michiru gradually develops feelings for Ethan.

Their relationship grows closer when Ethan helps Michiru stop three delinquent students from smoking on school grounds. Following the incident, Ethan becomes increasingly troubled. On the anniversary of his parents' deaths, he quietly draws his deceased parents in his notebook. Later that evening, while taking a walk to clear his mind, Ethan tells Michiru about his past and reveals that he lost his parents in a traffic accident when he was eight.

With 65 days remaining before the Sijil Pelajaran Malaysia examination, Michiru decides to study hard and strive for good results, hoping to repay Ethan's kindness. She also writes him a letter expressing her true feelings. However, Michiru is very shy to deliver the letter in person and unable to find a suitable opportunity to confess her feelings. As a result, her confession is repeatedly postponed until the final few days of classes after the grand examination.

During class, Michiru's teacher discusses the students' future paths and gives them encouragement with advice. Michiru suddenly runs out of the classroom in search of Ethan, who has gone to a nearby grocery store during school break, and purchases a colourful umbrella for her.

After Michiru finds Ethan, the two are involved in a traffic accident outside the school. Due to Michiru's recklessness, she fails to pay attention to the truck on road. Ethan immediately pushes Michiru out of harm and gets struck by the truck. Michiru remains unharmed with a great shock. The story ends at this point, with the subsequent events yet to be revealed.

== Characters ==
- Michiru: The female protagonist of the film and a Form Five student at a national-type secondary school. She is shy and passionate about writing fantasy romance novels. During the early story, she is uninterested in her studies and often being bullied by her classmates. After meeting Ethan, she later gains confidence and becomes a hall monitor alongside him. Her character design is based on an artificial intelligence/mascot character of the same name from "Isekai Zero", designed by Mïïn (敏).
- Ethan: The male protagonist of the film and a Form Five student at a national-type secondary school. His parents died in a car accident when he was eight years old. Quiet and observant, he is attentive to others and has a talent for drawing. After becoming friends with Michiru, he becomes her important creative partner and emotional support. He eventually gets involved in a traffic accident while saving Michiru. His character design is based on an artificial intelligence character of the same name from "Isekai Zero".
- Matthew: The male antagonist of the film and a Form Five student at a national-type secondary school. Mischievous and rebellious, he frequently bullies Michiru and also picks on other vulnerable students around him.
- Vera: The female antagonist of the film and a Form Five student at a national-type secondary school. She is Sharon's classmate and close friend, often mock Michiru together for satisfaction.
- Sharon: The female antagonist of the film and a Form Five student at a national-type secondary school. She is Vera's classmate and close friend, often mock Michiru together for satisfaction.
- Daren: A supporting male character and a Form Five student at a national-type secondary school. Reserved in personality and noticeably chubbier than most of his classmates. He is Matthew's second target of bullying.
- Teacher: A supporting female character. Michiru's class teacher. She has a humorous and witty personality.

== Production ==
During 2022, as artificial intelligence technology became increasingly widespread worldwide, Louis Muk, a member of ARx Media Sdn. Bhd. (汸舟未来科技有限公司), initiated the development of "Isekai Zero (異世界ゼロ)", an artificial intelligence role-playing application. In 2025, the team commissioned Sarawak-based artist, Mïïn to design "Michiru", the application's mascot character. The application was subsequently released on Google Play on 23 August 2025 and on the App Store in September of the same year.

Around March 2026, the production team of ARx Media Sdn. Bhd. began producing Michiru, a short film starring Michiru, the mascot character of "Isekai Zero". According to Jimsley Lim, the chief community officer of "Isekai Zero", the entire production process, from planning and scriptwriting to animation production, took approximately six months. The film was produced on a low budget.

During production, the team first photographed various locations in Sarawak and used the photographs of real-life locations as reference materials for the animation. These locations included the Kuching Waterfront, India Street, Carpenter Street, the Sarawak State Library, the Kuching South City Council, Padungan, the Malaysia-China Friendship Park, the Damai Beach Resort, as well as Tasik Biru and Siniawan Night Market in Bau. The team subsequently developed the script and storyboard before combining artificial intelligence-generated content with manual redrawing to produce the final animation. The production also incorporated Sarawak's local landscapes into the film and aimed to introduce Sarawak to international audiences. The artificial intelligence software used in the production included Nano Banana, ChatGPT, Seedance, Claude, and Suno.

== Music ==
=== Soundtrack ===
Michiru

Soundtrack album
- Released: 2026
- Language: Japanese

Michiru is released by ARx Media Sdn. Bhd. in 2026.

All music is composed by kheelstrife (Louis Muk).

No.	Title	Length
1.	"Transparent 透明な僕"	4:28
2.	"Warm Light あたたかい光"	5:04
3.	"The Light You Left On 灯り"	4:46

== Release ==
The premiere of Michiru was first announced in August 2026 through the official Facebook page and YouTube channel of "Isekai Zero". On 8 September 2026, Kuching South mayor Dato Wee Hong Seng also announced the film's premiere. Information about the film's release was subsequently reported by Sin Chew Daily, Sarawak Tribune, and Utusan Sarawak, which highlighted the significance of developing local creative talent and promoting Sarawak internationally.

The screening event was jointly organised by the Kuching South City Council and the Torabera ACG Festival. Michiru premiered at the Golden Screen Cinemas of The Spring Shopping Mall in Kuching, Sarawak, on 12 September 2026, followed by a worldwide premiere on YouTube on 16 September. A total of 550 free tickets were made available online for the premiere event.

== Reception ==
After the premiere of Michiru was announced on 8 September 2026, all 550 free tickets for the film were claimed within 24 hours. On the same day, several media outlets also published information about the film on social media platforms, prompting discussion among netizens.

Some young netizens, particularly those working in the animation industry and related fields, questioned the use of artificial intelligence in the film's production. They raised concerns about copyright and potential infringement issues involving AI-generated content and pointed out similarities between the film's overall visual style and the works of Japanese anime director, Makoto Shinkai. Some also expressed concerns that the team's use of artificial intelligence in animation production could reduce the emphasis placed on local animation and creative talent, while arguing that the film's release on Malaysia Day was inappropriate.

Other netizens considered the film's overall visual style to be too similar to Japanese animation and said that it had insufficient connections to Malaysian culture. Some also compared the film with the Chinese animated film Niu Lai, directed by Xin Yumeng and written by Sun Lifang, expressing a preference for works created by human animators over AI-generated animation.

Some netizens also noticed the involvement of Sarawak artist, Mïïn in the character design after seeing the list of production personnel on the film's poster. Mïïn stated that he had previously shared the completed character design of "Michiru", the mascot character of "Isekai Zero", publicly on Facebook and subsequently sold the design to ARx Media Sdn. Bhd. According to Mïïn, the parties did not establish specific restrictions on the permitted uses of the character design when the transaction took place. He was generally aware that ARx Media Sdn. Bhd. would use the design for its products, but only learned around the time the premiere of Michiru was announced that the character had also been used in the production of the film.

Dato Wee Hong Seng stated that the Kuching South City Council's support for Michiru did not mean that it fully endorsed the use of artificial intelligence, but was intended to encourage Sarawakian talent to create works within certain limitations and regulations.
