= List of shipwrecks in April 1889 =

The list of shipwrecks in April 1889 includes ships sunk, foundered, grounded, or otherwise lost during April 1889.

== 1 April ==
List of shipwrecks: 1 April 1889
Ship	State	Description
Domino	United Kingdom	The steamship was driven ashore at "Ramsohoen", north of Kristiansand, Norway. She was on a voyage from Hull, Yorkshire to Trondheim, Norway. She was later refloated.
Gettysburg	United Kingdom	The barque struck a reef in the Morant Cays and was wrecked with theb loss of seven of her seventeen crew. She was on a voyage from Montevideo, Uruguay to Pensacola, Florida, United States.
Gulf of Mexico	United Kingdom	The steamship collided with the steamship Fulmar (United Kingdom) in the Scheldt and was severely damaged. Gulf of Mexico was on a voyage from Dunkirk, Nord to Antwerp, Belgium. Gulf of Mexico was towed in to Antwerp.
John	United Kingdom	The lighter was run into by the steamship State of Georgia (United Kingdom) and sank in the Clyde near Dumbarton. Her crew survived.
Springhall	United Kingdom	The steamship ran aground on the Goodwin Sands, Kent.
St. Audries	United Kingdom	The steamship sank at Le Sables-d'Olonne, Vendée, France. Her crew were rescued.

== 2 April ==
List of shipwrecks: 2 April 1889
Ship	State	Description
Advance	United Kingdom	The steamship suffered a boiler explosion at Penarth, Glamorgan. A crew member was killed.
Felix Anna	France	The schooner ran aground on the East Ham Sands, in Liverpool Bay. She was on a voyage from Runcorn, Cheshire, United Kingdom. She was refloated and taken in to Liverpool, Lancashire, United Kingdom.
Inflexible	United Kingdom	The fishing trawler was driven ashore at Godrevy, Cornwall. She floated off and sank. Her seven crew survived.

== 3 April ==
List of shipwrecks: 3 April 1889
Ship	State	Description
Freia	Norway	The barque ran aground. She was on a voyage from Bo'ness, Lothian, United Kingdom to Drontheim. She was refloated and towed in to Kristiansund in a leaky condition.
Sir Robert Hodgson	United Kingdom	The schooner was run into by the gunboat Ville d'Anvers ( (Belgium) Belgian Army) off Great Yarmouth, Norfolk and was damaged. Sir Robert Hodgson was on a voyage from Rouen, Seine-Inférieure, France to Sunderland, County Durham.

== 4 April ==
List of shipwrecks: 4 April 1889
Ship	State	Description
Merton Hall	United Kingdom	The steamship ran aground in the Suez Canal. She was on a voyage from Bombay, India to Liverpool, Lancashire. She was refloated and resumed her voyage.
Newcastle Packet	Norway	The schooner was wrecked on the Isle of May, Fife, United Kingdom with the loss of two of her crew. She was on a voyage from Kristiansand to Grangemouth, Stirlingshire, United Kingdom.

== 5 April ==
List of shipwrecks: 5 April 1889
Ship	State	Description
Douglas	United Kingdom	The steamship, a collier ran aground off Amrum, Germany. She was refloated and taken in to Hamburg, Germany.
Freihandel	Netherlands	The ship departed from Liverpool, Lancashire, United Kingdom for Buenos Aires, Argentina. No further trace, reported missing.
Marchioness of Londonderry	United Kingdom	The ship ran aground on Jenkins Flat, in the River Thames. She was refloated.
Merlin	United Kingdom	The steamship ran aground at Garston, Lancashire. She was on a voyage from Huelva, Spain to Garston.

== 6 April ==
List of shipwrecks: 6 April 1889
Ship	State	Description
Carrie Dingle	United Kingdom	The brigantine was run into by the steamship Noordland (Belgium) and sank in the English Channel 7 nautical miles (13 km) south of the Royal Sovereign Lightship ( Trinity House). Her five crew were rescued by Noordland. Carrie Dingle was on a voyage from Portmadoc, Caernarfonshire to Hamburg, Germany.
Danmark	Denmark	The passenger ship foundered in the North Atlantic after her propeller shaft snapped. A total of 721 passengers and crew were rescued by the steamship Missouri (United States). Abandoned and almost submerged, the wreck of Danmark was found on 8 April by the passenger steamer RMS City of Chester (United Kingdom) at 45°55′N 37°16′W.
Percy	United Kingdom	The Mersey Flat was driven ashore and wrecked at Cemlyn, Anglesey. She was on a voyage from West Bank, Cheshire to Holyhead, Anglesey.
Sicily	United Kingdom	The ship put in to Madeira on fire. She was on a voyage from Paraíba, Brazil to Liverpool, Lancashire. The fire was extinguished.

== 7 April ==
List of shipwrecks: 7 April 1889
Ship	State	Description
Calistoga	United Kingdom	The ship collided with a smack in the North Sea 38 nautical miles (70 km) east of Flamborough Head, Yorkshire and was damaged. She was on a voyage from Hull, Yorkshire to Cardiff, Glamorgan. She put in to Grimsby, Lincolnshire in a leaky condition.
Emilie	Germany	The barque was abandoned in the Atlantic Ocean (47°58′N 19°22′W) with the loss of three of her fourteen crew. Survivors were rescued by the steamship Holland (United Kingdom). Emilie was on a voyage from Pensacola, Florida, United States to Brake.
Luigi	Italy	The barque ran aground at Gibraltar.
Northampton	United States	The schooner/oyster pungy (36 tons) was driven ashore in a gale 5 miles south of Cape Henry. Her Captain and 2 crewmen died, 1 survived.
USS Pensacola	United States Navy	The gunboat sank at Portsmouth Navy Yard, New Hampshire when a drydock was inundated.
Unnamed	United States	The collier foundered in Delaware Bay with the loss of five lives.

== 8 April ==
List of shipwrecks: 8 April 1889
Ship	State	Description
Abeona	United Kingdom	The steamship ran aground in the Lynn Channel. She was on a voyage from King's Lynn, Norfolk to the "North Light".
Cotopaxi	United Kingdom	The steamship was run into by the steamship Olympia (Germany) off Punta Arenas, Chile and was beached. She was on a voyage from Montevideo, Uruguay to Valparaíso, Chile. Following temporary repairs, she resumed her voyage the next day.
Ethel	United Kingdom	The ship struck rocks in Donegal Bay and sprang a leak. She was on a voyage from Liverpool, Lancashire to Donegal. She was beached at Killybegs, County Donegal.
Hawarden Castle, and Sierra Nevada	United Kingdom; United States	The steamships collided at Port Elizabeth, Cape Colony and were damaged. Sierra Nevada was on a voyage from Calcutta, India to New York.
Inga	Norway	The brig ran aground off the coast of Nord, France. She was refloated.
Olympia	Germany	The steamship collided with the steamship Cotopaxi (Chile) in the Strait of Magellan and was beached. Her passengers were taken off.
Schamyl	Norway	The barque was wrecked on the Haisborough Sands, in the North Sea off the coast of Norfolk, United Kingdom. Her crew were rescued by the lugger Nouvelle Calais (France). Schamyl was on a voyage from Arendal to Truro, Cornwall, United Kingdom.
Unnamed	Flag unknown	The steamship ran aground on the Shipwash Sand, in the North Sea off the coast of Suffolk, United Kingdom.

== 9 April ==
List of shipwrecks: 9 April 1889
Ship	State	Description
Bona Fides	Norway	The full-rigged ship was wrecked at "Eastern Fields", Queensland. She was on a voyage from Newcastle, New South Wales to Java, Netherlands East Indies.
City of Dortmund	Flag unknown	The steamship ran aground in the Belfast Lough near the Garmoyle Lightship ( Trinity House).

== 10 April ==
List of shipwrecks: 10 April 1889
Ship	State	Description
Abicore	United Kingdom	The steamship ran aground on the Gunfleet Sand, in the North Sea off the coast of Essex and sank.
Libra	United Kingdom	The steamship collided with the steamship Stancliffe (United Kingdom) and sank off the Outer Dowsing Sandbank, in the North Sea off the coast of Norfolk. Her crew were rescued by Stancliffe. Libra was on a voyage from Granton, Lothian to London.
Unnamed	Sweden	The ship was driven ashore at Muros Spain.
Palakta	Flag unknown	The schooner was abandoned in the Atlantic Ocean.

== 11 April ==
List of shipwrecks: 11 April 1889
Ship	State	Description
Pinelis	France	The brig was abandoned at sea. Her crew were rescued by the steamship Lys (United Kingdom).

== 12 April ==
List of shipwrecks: 12 April 1889
Ship	State	Description
Amelia	France	The fishing brig was abandoned at sea and foundered off The Lizard. The captain and twenty-one crew were landed at Plymouth by the Lysgand (Belgium).

== 13 April ==
List of shipwrecks: 13 April 1889
Ship	State	Description
Commodore Bateman	United States	The pilot boat was run into and sunk off Georges Bank, Cape Cod, Massachusetts by the steamship Suevia (Germany) with the loss of two lives.

== 14 April ==
List of shipwrecks: 14 April 1889
Ship	State	Description
Cotopaxi	United Kingdom	The steamship struck a sunken rock in the Smyth Channel and foundered (48°44′00″S 74°25′30″W). All on board, more than 200 people, reached shore. They were rescued the next day by the steamship Setos (Germany). Cotopaxi was on a voyage from Montevideo, Uruguay to Valparaíso, Chile.

== 16 April ==
List of shipwrecks: 16 April 1889
Ship	State	Description
Albyn	United Kingdom	The full-rigged ship caught fire in the Indian Ocean. She was on a voyage from Calcutta, India to Dundee, Forfarshire. The fire was extinguished and she continued her voyage.

== 17 April ==
List of shipwrecks: 17 April 1889
Ship	State	Description
John Shay	United States	The schooner was driven ashore and went to pieces in an attempt to beach in a gale 3 miles north of Cape Hatteras. Her Captain and all 5 crewmen died.

== 18 April ==
List of shipwrecks: 18 April 1889
Ship	State	Description
Everett	United States	The steamship was sunk in a wind storm in the Mississippi River near Burlington, Iowa. Five people were killed.

== 19 April ==
List of shipwrecks: 19 April 1889
Ship	State	Description
Brocklesby	United Kingdom	The brigantine ran aground on the Gunfleet Sand, in the North Sea off the coast of Essex.
Carl Emil	Denmark	The cargo schooner sprung a leak in a gale in the North Sea and was abandoned in sinking condition. The crew were rescued by the trawler Talifoo (United Kingdom).
Ocean King	United Kingdom	The steamship ran aground in the Thames Estuary off Shoeburyness, Essex. She was refloated with the assistance of two tugs.

== 20 April ==
List of shipwrecks: 20 April 1889
Ship	State	Description
Atalanta	United Kingdom	The steamship was run into by the steamship Redewater (United Kingdom) at Gibraltar and was beached.
William Leavitt	United Kingdom	The barque was abandoned in the Irish Sea 10 nautical miles (19 km) south of Little Ross, Wigtownshire. Her crew were rescued by the tug Hercules (United Kingdom), which was towing William Leavitt from Maryport, Cumberland to Greenock, Renfrewshire.

== 21 April ==
List of shipwrecks: 21 April 1889
Ship	State	Description
Arago	United Kingdom	The steamship was drive ashore in the Dardanelles. She was on a voyage from Liverpool, Lancashire to Odesa, Russia. She was refloated with the assistance of a tug.
Fernlands	United Kingdom	The steamship ran aground on the Spijkerplaat, in the North Sea off the coast of Zeeland, Netherlands. She was on a voyage from Bombay, India to Antwerp, Belgium. She was later refloated with the assistance of a steamship and resumed her voyage.
Lady Cathcart	United Kingdom	The steamship was driven ashore and wrecked at Gourdon, Aberdeenshire. Her crew were rescued. She was on a voyage from Kennetpans, Clackmannanshire to Aberdeen.

== 22 April ==
List of shipwrecks: 22 April 1889
Ship	State	Description
Altmore	United Kingdom	The steamship was wrecked in the Fiji Islands with loss of life.
Drumsyme	United Kingdom	The steamship was driven ashore near Campbeltown, Argyllshire. She subsequently became a wreck.
Emerald	United Kingdom	The schooner was driven ashore at Moville, County Donegal. She was on a voyage from Garston, Lancashire to Sligo.
Lizzie Williams	United States	The barque was wrecked on a shoal off Tugidak Island, District of Alaska. All 96 people on board survived. They were rescued by the steamships Al-Ki and Elsie (both United States). Lizzie Williams was on a voyage from San Francisco, California to Kodiak Island, District of Alaska.
Metropolitan, and Pilgrim	United States; United Kingdom	The steamships collided in Hell Gate, New York. Metropolitan was beached. She was on a voyage from New York to New London.

== 23 April ==
List of shipwrecks: 23 April 1889
Ship	State	Description
Iota	Norway	The barque was wrecked in Henne Bay, Haiti. She was on a voyage from Port-au-Prince to Grand Saline, Texas, United States.
Lady Brassey	United Kingdom	The steamship ran aground off Hastings Pier, Sussex and lost both propellers. She was refloated and proceeded under sail. Subsequently towed in to Dover, Kent by the tug Lady Vita (United Kingdom).
Tavistock	United Kingdom	The barge capsized off Dawlish, Devon. Both crew survived.
Unnamed	Flag unknown	The steamship was driven ashore near the Hela Lighthouse, Germany.

== 24 April ==
List of shipwrecks: 24 April 1889
Ship	State	Description
Sylvia	Italy	The steamship caught fire at Alexandria, Egypt and was scuttled.

== 25 April ==
List of shipwrecks: 25 April 1889
Ship	State	Description
Glenpadarn	United Kingdom	The ship departed from Rangoon, Burma for the English Channel. No further trace, reported missing.

== 27 April ==
List of shipwrecks: 27 April 1889
Ship	State	Description
Katie	United Kingdom	The steamship ran aground in the Suez Canal. She was on a voyage from Bombay, India to Le Havre, Seine-Inférieure, France. She was refloated the next day.
King's Cross	United Kingdom	The ship was driven ashore at Dungeness, Kent. She was refloated with assistance from the tugs Challenger and Condor (both United Kingdom).
Mona	United Kingdom	The yawl was run down by a steamship and sank in the English Channel off Dungeness. Her crew were rescued.
Oneida	United States	The steamship was wrecked on Sanek Island, in the Bering Sea with the loss of 77 of the 155 people on board.
Penedo	United Kingdom	The steamship was driven ashore. She was on a voyage from Blyth, Northumberland to Copenhagen, Denmark. She was refloated and put into the River Tyne.
William	(United Kingdom of Great Britain and Ireland) Guernsey	The brig capsized in the River Wear.

== 28 April ==
List of shipwrecks: 28 April 1889
Ship	State	Description
Albert, Château Margeaux, and Manora	United Kingdom; France; United Kingdom	The fishing smack Albert was run into by the steamship Manora off the South Foreland, Kent and was damaged. Albert was subsequently assisted in to Ramsgate, Kent. Subsequently, the steamship Château Margeaux collided with Manora in the English Channel 8 nautical miles (15 km) east of the Royal Sovereign Lightship ( Trinity House). Château Margeaux was on a voyage from Le Havre, Seine-Inférieure to Antwerp, Belgium. She was taken in tow by the steamship Lyon (France) but sank 18 nautical miles (33 km) north west of Cape Ailly, Seine-Inférieure. Her crew were rescued by a French pilot cutter. Manora was severely damaged at the bow. She was on a voyage from London to Calcutta, India. She put back to Gravesend, Kent.
Barnesmore, and Ville de Havre	United Kingdom; France	The steamships collided in the Mediterranean Sea 10 nautical miles (19 km) east of Gibraltar. Ville de Havre sank with the loss of four lives. Barnesmore was severely damaged.

== 29 April ==
List of shipwrecks: 29 April 1889
Ship	State	Description
Anna B. Cannon	United States	The schooner was wrecked on Milk Island. Her crew were rescued.
Moss Rose	United Kingdom	The cutter ran aground on the Brake Sand, off the Kent coast.
No. 2	France	The dredger suffered a boiler explosion and sank at Calais with the loss of three of the nine people on board.

== 30 April ==
List of shipwrecks: 30 April 1889
Ship	State	Description
Godmunding	Flag unknown	The steamship collided with the quayside at Leith, Lothian, United Kingdom and severely damaged her bow.

== Unknown date ==
List of shipwrecks: Unknown date in April 1889
Ship	State	Description
Afghan	United Kingdom	The steamship was driven ashore at Tam Kan, China. She was on a voyage from Kobe, Japan to Hong Kong. She was refloated and completed her voyage in a leaky condition. She was placed under repair.
Alpha	Norway	The steamship ran aground on the Malo Reef, in the Baltic Sea. She was on a voyage from a Baltic port to Hartlepool, County Durham, United Kingdom. She was refloated with assistance.
Amigo	Germany	The steamship ran aground on the Apo Shoal. She was refloated.
Ashdell	United Kingdom	The steamship was driven ashore on the coast of Puerto Rico.
Atalanta	United Kingdom	The steamship was driven ashore at Gibraltar. She was later refloated.
Bona Fides	Norway	The ship was wrecked at "Eastern Fields". She was on a voyage from Newcastle, New South Wales to Java, Netherlands East Indies.
Catina E	Austria-Hungary	The barque was driven ashore and wrecked at Le Robert, Martinique. Her crew were rescued. She was on a voyage from Le Robert to Marseille, Bouches-du-Rhône, France.
Caurenze	Flag unknown	The ship ran aground at Liverpool, Lancashire, United Kingdom. She was on a voyage from Christiania, Norway to Liverpool.
Ceres	Norway	The schooner became waterlogged in the Dogger Bank. Her crew were rescued by the fishing smack Freedom (United Kingdom). Ceres was towed in to the River Tyne by Freedom and the steam trawler Adonis (United Kingdom.
Colleen Bawn, and Dunvegan Castle	United Kingdom	The steamship Dunvegan Castle collided with the steamship Colleen Bawn and sank at Liverpool. Her crew were rescued. Dunvegan Castle was on a voyage from Workington, Cumberland to Liverpool. Colleen Bawn was severely damaged. She was on a voyage from Liverpool to Drogheda, County Louth.
Concord	Germany	The barque was driven ashore and wrecked at Monte Christi, Dominican Republic.
Concordia	Netherlands	The brig was abandoned in the North Sea. Her crew were rescued by Antares (United States).
Connecticut	United States	The coaster, a steamship, was driven ashore on the coast of Rhode Island.
Danube	United Kingdom	The steamship collided with the steamship Alliance (United States) and sank 12 nautical miles (22 km) south of Portland, Oregon, United States.
David W. Hunt	United States	The full-rigged ship was abandoned in the Atlantic Ocean before 24 April.
Devonia	United Kingdom	The steamship was run into by the steamship Robert Brown (United Kingdom) and sank at Taganrog, Russia.
Eagle, and Stakesby	United Kingdom	The steamship Stakesby collided with the hulk Eagle at Gibraltar. Both vessels were damaged.
Edward Williams	United Kingdom	The ship was driven ashore and severely damaged at Ardrossan, Ayrshire. She was refloated on 24 April.
Elk	United Kingdom	The steamship ran aground in the Danube 35 nautical miles (65 km) from its mouth.
Ena	Victoria	The steamship was driven from her mooring before 19 April and was presumed to have foundered off the coast of New South Wales.
Gem	United Kingdom	The schooner collided with the steamship Gregory (United Kingdom) and sank at Le Havre, Seine-Inférieure, France. Her crew were rescued.
Gulf of Aden	United Kingdom	The ship caught fire at Coquimbo, Chile. The fire was extinguished.
Helena	Germany	The barque was driven ashore on the Tybee Knowl, Georgia, United States.
H. Printzenberg	Germany	The barque foundered at sea. Her crew were rescued. She was on a voyage from Singapore, Straits Settlements to Hong Kong.
Irene	United Kingdom	The ship, a brig or brigantine, was driven ashore at Dungeness, Kent. She was on a voyage from Blyth, Northumberland to Plymouth, Devon. She was refloated and towed in to Dover, Kent in a leaky condition.
Jane Amwyl	United Kingdom	The schooner collided with the steamship Plymothian (United Kingdom) and sank. Her crew were rescued.
Jane and Ann	United Kingdom	The ship foundered off the east Kent coast.
Kate C. Maguire	United Kingdom	The barque was driven ashore at Swansea, Glamorgan. She was on a voyage from Saint John, New Brunswick, Canada to Swansea. She was refloated with assistance and taken in to Swansea.
Kepler	Germany	The steamship collided with the tug Itzehoe (Germany) and ran aground on the Schwarz Tonnensand. Kepler was on a voyage from Hamburg to Port Pirie, South Australia.
Lady Margaret	United Kingdom	The steamship collided with the steamship Waverley (United Kingdom) at Weston-super-Mare, Somerset and was severely damaged.
Lake Ontario	United Kingdom	The steamship capsized at Liverpool.
Laurence	Norway	The brig ran aground at Waterloo, Lancashire.
Lilydale	United Kingdom	The steamship was sunk by ice in the Baltic Sea 15 nautical miles (28 km) off the north point of Öland, Sweden. Her crew were rescued.
Lizzie Carr	United States	The schooner collided with a floating wreck and sprang a leak. She put in to Philadelphia, Pennsylvania.
Margaret	United Kingdom	The schooner was abandoned at sea. Her crew were rescued.
Maripesa	United States	The steamship put in to Auckland, New Zealand on fire.
Metropolitan	Flag unknown	The ship was beached on "Pikers Island". She was on a voyage from New York, United States to London, United Kingdom.
Moulton	United States	The schooner was abandoned at sea. Some of her crew were rescued by the steamship Claribel (Flag unknown). Moulton was on a voyage from the Black River, Jamaica to Chester, Pennsylvania.
Munib	India	The flat sank at Kulpee.
Northern Belle	United Kingdom	The ship was wrecked at Brisbane, Queensland.
Odd	Norway	The barque was wrecked at Viseu, Brazil. Her crew were rescued.
Œnone	(United Kingdom of Great Britain and Ireland) Guernsey	The ship struck a rock at Saint-Malo, Ille-et-Vilaine, France and was severely damaged. She was on a voyage from Guernsey to Saint-Malo.
Old Kensington	United States	The ship caught fire and was beached at San Pedro, California.
Oranmore	United Kingdom	The steamship was driven ashore at the mouth of the Rappahannock River. She was on a voyage from Liverpool to Baltimore, Maryland, United States. She was refloated.
Pedro Turall	Spain	The brigantine was driven ashore and wrecked at Caminha, Portugal.
Philothea	Germany	The schooner was driven ashore and wrecked at Tangier, Morocco.
Pioneer	Germany	The steamship was driven ashore at Rügenwalde. She was on a voyage from Stettin to Königsberg.
Richard P. Buck	United States	The ship caught fire at Bermuda and was scuttled. She was on a voyage from Philadelphia to San Francisco, California.
Robert Ingham	United Kingdom	The steamship ran aground at Zincirbozan, Ottoman Empire. She was on a voyage from Taganrog to Cagliari, Sardinia, Italy.
Schamyl	Norway	The barque ran aground on the Haisborough Sands, in the North Sea off the coast of Norfolk, United Kingdom and was abandoned by her crew. She was on a voyage from Arendal to Truro, Cornwall, United Kingdom.
Sjaelland	Denmark	The steamship was driven ashore at Falsterbo, Sweden. She was on a voyage from Hull, Yorkshire, United Kingdom to Norrköping, Sweden. She was refloated with the assistance of a steamship and taken in to Copenhagen.
Soskommeren	Norway	The barque ran aground at Pará, Brazil and was severely damaged. She was on a voyage from Liverpool to Pará. She was refloated.
Sverre	Norway	The barque ran aground in the Douro. She was on a voyage from Pensacola, Florida, United States to Porto, Portugal.
Tavistock	United Kingdom	The sloop foundered off Dawlish, Devon. Her crew survived.
Tewkesbury	United Kingdom	The barque was wrecked in the Caroline Islands. Her crew survived.
Westergate	United Kingdom	The steamship was driven ashore at Breaksea Point, Glamorgan. She was refloated on 26 April and taken in to Cardiff, Glamorgan.
William Duthie	United Kingdom	The ship was destroyed by fire at Chittagong, India.
William Jones	United Kingdom	The schooner ran aground at Kingstown, County Dublin. She was on a voyage from London to Newry, County Antrim. She was refloated and beached.
Wolseley	Norway	The barque was driven ashore and wrecked at Cape Hatteras, North Carolina, United States. Her crew were rescued. She was on a voyage from Buenos Aires, Argentina to Portland, Maine, United States.
Woodlands	United Kingdom	The steamship caught fire at Huelva, Spain. The fire was extinguished.
Zarifa	United States	The ship was wrecked on the Moselle Shoals. She was on a voyage from New York to Veracruz, Mexico.
Zeemeuw	Netherlands	The brig ran aground. She was on a voyage from Burntisland, Fife, United Kingdom to Kastrup, Denmark. She was refloated with assistance.
Unnamed	United States	The lighter caught fire at Savannah, Georgia.
