= Malaysia-Israel Letter =

The Malaysia-Israel Letter is a July 21, 2026 letter written by 8 Democratic members of the United States House of Representatives to US Secretary of State Marco Rubio demanding he suspend military cooperation between the United States and Malaysia over comments made earlier in July by Prime Minister Anwar Ibrahim pledging to deport any Israeli citizens found in Malaysia. The letter was led by Ohio congressman Greg Landsman.

== Background ==
Malaysia and Israel do not maintain formal diplomatic relations. Israeli passport holders are banned from entering Malaysia without written permission from the Malaysian Ministry of Home Affairs.

On July 15, 2026, Prime Minister of Malaysia Anwar Ibrahim announced Malaysia would immediate deport Israeli citizens found in the country, following public outcry over claims that the Network School, a digital nomad community in Johor's Forest City led by former Coinbase Chief Technology Officer Balaji Srinivasan, had several members who were dual nationals of Israel and entered Malaysia on their non-Israeli passports.

Malaysia is a recipient of United States International Military Education and Training (IMET) funding, which allows for 50 Malaysian military personnel to train under IMET.

On July 18, 2026, congressman Greg Landsman released a statement writing, "They’re kicking Jews out of Malaysia. We’ve seen this all before. The purge of Jews has begun. Predictable, and just the beginning. We know where this leads. There is only one country in the world that will take all Jews kicked out of another country, and that’s Israel. The same people targeting Jews in their countries are also working to destroy Israel."

== Text ==
The letter characterized Malaysia's policy of deporting Israelis as antisemitic and discriminatory.

The letter criticized lack of recognition for Israel as "troubling enough", writing, "It is totally unacceptable that a head of government has publicly declared that his country will hunt down and expel citizens of our close ally based solely on their nationality. It should not be underwritten by the American taxpayer."

The letter also criticized Malaysia's relationship with Hamas, alleging Hamas members had trained in Malaysia and that the country was "welcoming terrorists while targeting Jews".

The letter wrote that if Ibrahim did not reverse his policy of deporting Israelis within 15 days, the US should suspend further IMET funding to Malaysia and Rubio should re-evaluate the US-Malaysia economic relationship.

== Reaction ==
On July 22, Prime Minister of Malaysia Anwar Ibrahim reaffirmed Malaysia would maintain its ban on Israelis. Ibrahim noted the policy was not new, had been in place for decades, and should be known to the United States.

Ibrahim criticized the letter, saying, "This is totally absurd because, as far was we are concerned, this policy has been adopted by Malaysia for decades, that we are against the presence of any Israeli citizens, not Jews, but Israeli citizens here because they are part and parcel and complicit to the murders, crimes and continuous oppression, colonisation of Palestine and Gaza."

The United States Department of State summoned Malaysian Ambassador to the United States Tan Sri Muhammad Shahrul Ikram Yaakob over Anwar's comments, and he subsequently affirmed Malaysia's policy of not recognizing Israel. Foreign Minister Datuk Seri Mohamad Hasan said to reporters that "Malaysia has never recognised Israel or the Zionist regime. Therefore, the implementation of our immigration policy is consistent with that position."

In The Rakyat Post, Sharil Bahrom and Fernando Fong wrote that "Malaysia has a clear policy on barring Israeli citizens, not those of the Jewish faith specifically," adding that "The Malaysian government bars entry to Israeli citizens or anyone who holds an Israeli passport."
