= Daily Express (disambiguation) =

The Daily Express is a conservative, middle-market British tabloid newspaper and the flagship title of Express Newspapers.

Daily Express may also refer to:

- Daily Express (Dublin), a former Irish newspaper
- Daily Express, a former Scottish newspaper which merged with the Caledonian Mercury in 1859 to form the Caledonian Mercury and Daily Express
- Daily Express (Urdu newspaper), an Urdu-language newspaper in Pakistan
- Daily Express (Malaysia), an English-language newspaper in Sabah, Malaysia
- Daily Express (Trinidad), Trinidadian English-language daily
- Daily Express, a defunct newspaper in Petersburg, Virginia
