= The Accidental Malay =

Novel by Karina Bahrin

- Author: Karina Bahrin
- Language: English
- Publisher: Epigram Books
- Publication date: 1 January 2022
- ISBN: 981498468X
- OCLC: 1466116125

The Accidental Malay is a novel written by Malaysian author Karina Bahrin. Her debut novel, it follows Jasmine Leong, a 41-year-old woman set to inherit her family's billion-riggit business who learns that she is of partial Malay descent, instead of being entirely of Chinese descent as she had previously believed. The manuscript won the Epigram Books of Fiction Prize 2022, for which Bahrin was awarded RM78,000 and a publishing contract.

== Reception ==
Tan Gim Ean of Options opined that Bahrin "writes with the assuredness of someone who has thought long and deep about issues that have been eating away at the country." Olivia Ho of The Straits Times gave the novel 3 stars out of 5 and called it a "bold, taboo-breaking take on Malaysian social mores - it conveys the frustrations of living in a society where a religious majority is allowed to exert influence over the secular sphere." Elena Koshy of The New Straits Times opined that it "falters at the end" with a "contrived" and "all-too-convenient conclusion", which "does the story a great injustice".
