= New Sabah Times =

- Front page, 26 April 2009
- Type: Daily newspaper
- Format: Tabloid
- Owner: Inna Kinabalu Sdn. Bhd.
- Editor: Jerry Kamijan
- Founded: 1949
- Ceased publication: 31 December 2020
- Language: Malay; English; Kadazandusun
- Headquarters: Jalan Pusat Pembangunan Masyarakat/Lorong Selungsung D, off Jalan Mat Salleh, Sembulan, 88100 Kota Kinabalu, Sabah.
- Circulation: 19,210*Source: Audit Bureau of Circulations, Malaysia – July 2013– Dec 2013
- Website: www.newsabahtimes.com.my

The New Sabah Times was a newspaper in Sabah, Malaysia. The Sabah Times commenced publication on 21 January 1953, published by Donald Stephens (later Tun Fuad Stephens) and had a daily circulation of approximately 1000. It was the only English-language daily newspaper. The North Borneo News, first published in 1948 in Sandakan was a fortnightly, then weekly periodical with a circulation of approximately 750. It mainly reported Advisory Council news, excerpts from other newspapers and some local and overseas news. Donald Stephens was a reporter for the publication. It began publishing daily in April 1954 but soon amalgamated with the Sabah Times later in 1954 under joint editorship. It included a page of romanised Malay and Dusun to give it wider appeal and increased its circulation.

In March 1995, the newspaper shut down. In March 1998, the newspaper was acquired by Inna Kinabalu Sdn Bhd. and revived as the New Sabah Times. In late December 2020, the newspaper's management announced that the New Sabah Times was shutting down again due to declining circulation and advertising revenue.

== History ==
The Sabah Times commenced publication on 21 January 1953, published by Donald Stephens (later Tun Fuad Stephens), and made possible with $1,000 given to him by his brother Ben, and had a daily circulation of approximately 1,000. It was the first English-language daily newspaper in British North Borneo. Donald Stephens later became the first Chief Minister when Sabah gained its independence from British and joined Malaya and Sarawak to form Malaysia on 16 September 1963.

The Sabah Times first shut down on 24 March 1995. The newspaper was revived as the New Sabah Times on 8 March 1998 after being bought by the publishing company Inna Kinabalu Sdn. Bhd. For a time, the newspaper was regarded as one of the fastest growing newspapers in Sabah. While the newspaper was primarily an English-language publication, it also had Malay and Kadazandusun language editions. The newspaper relied on print subscriptions but also had an electronic paper edition.

On 8 December 2020, the newspaper announced that it would be closing down on 20 December, which was later moved to 31 December 2020. With the closure of the New Sabah Times, the Daily Express and the Sarawak–based The Borneo Post remain the only English-language newspapers in Sabah.

== See also ==
- List of newspapers in Malaysia
