= Makkal Osai =

Newspaper in Malaysia

Makkal Osai மக்கள் ஓசை
- Type: Daily newspaper
- Format: Broadsheet
- Owner(s): Malaysian Indian Congress
- Founded: 1981 (as the Tamil Osai)
- Language: Tamil
- Headquarters: Kuala Lumpur, Malaysia.
- Circulation: 45,037; *Source: Audit Bureau of Circulations, Malaysia - July to December 2015
- Website: https://makkalosai.com.my/

The Makkal Osai (Tamil: மக்கள் ஓசை; "People's Voice") is a Tamil daily newspaper based in Malaysia, one of a few Tamil-language dailies in the country, alongside the Malaysia Nanban, the Tamil Malar and, formerly, the Tamil Nesan.

== Overview ==
The Makkal Osai was founded in 1981 as the Tamil Osai (the Tamil's Voice), which ceased operations in 1990 following a management dispute. An offshoot of the paper, which carried on the Tamil Osai name, was formed as a result, but dropped the name in 2005, to be renamed as the "Makkal Osai"; in December 2005, the newspaper became a daily. As of 2008, the Makkal Osai has a daily circulation of 52000 copies and 95000 on weekends, and employs 102 staff.

Former Malaysian Indian Congress (MIC) deputy president S. Subramaniam, who is known to have developed an enmity with MIC president Samy Vellu, is closely linked to the Makkal Osai. The paper has reported critically against the MIC, such as criticism on the party's investment arm, MAIKA Holdings.

== Controversies ==
=== Jesus Christ caricature ===
On its 21 August 2007 issue, the Makkal Osai printed a caricature of Jesus Christ holding a cigarette in one hand and a can of beer in the other. The caricature, which was placed on the front page of the paper beside the masthead, was intended to accompany a caption roughly quoting Jesus Christ to encourage sinners to repent ("If someone repents for his mistakes, then heaven awaits them."). It was part of the paper's regular "Thought for the Day" that highlighted famous quotations of world leaders and philosophers.

The caricature courted significant controversy in the following days. Reaction from the local religious community, predominantly Christian groups, were generally negative. Archbishop of the Roman Catholic Archdiocese of Kuala Lumpur, Murphy Pakiam, concluded the caricature desecrates the image of Jesus, is thus hurtful to Catholics, while adding the picture is of bad taste, even though the use of the caricature and its message was "to call repentant sinners to hope and salvation". Bishop Julius Paul from the Evangelical Lutheran Church in Malaysia called for a ban on the Makkal Osai, comparing the situation with the reprinting of Jyllands-Posten's Muhammad cartoons in February 2006 by two Malaysian newspapers, the Sarawak Tribune and the Guang Ming Daily, which were shut down and suspended, respectively. Meanwhile, the Malaysian Consultative Council of Buddhism, Christianity, Hinduism and Sikhism (MCCBCHS), which represents 90 percent of the Malaysian Christian community, had asked that the authorities to investigate and take action against those in Makkal Osai who were responsible of the caricature. The Malaysian Indian Congress was also among those critical of the paper's caricature. The party's deputy president, G. Palanivel, wanted the Home Ministry to act against Makkal Osai for offending Christians in Malaysian, while the Youth wing of the party submitted a four-page memorandum to the Prime Minister's office requesting the government revoke Makkal Osai's publication permit. Peter s/o Sinnappan, an MIC Puchong member, lodged a police report against the paper.

In the two days after the caricature was published, Makkal Osai issued two public apologies on the papers' second pages, stating the editorial team of the paper regretted publishing the picture. Makkal Osai news editor B. R. Rajen was also quoted to have explained the publication of the picture was not done with ill intent, and the staff responsible for allowing the image to be published has been suspended indefinitely. As of 25 August, the Roman Catholic Church and the Council of Churches Malaysia, representing the mainstream Protestants, accepted Makkal Osai's apology. Nevertheless, the Internal Security Ministry acted against Makkal Osai by ordering the paper to seize publication for a month effective 24 August 2007. Upon consultation with Christian leaders in the MCCBCHS, the MCCBCHS found the suspension to be "drastic" for a "genuine error"; Murphy Pakiam was "perplexed and bemused" by the suspension. In a 25 August press statement, Makkal Osai general manager M. Periasamy alleged the MIC has blown the matter out of proportion, failed to respect the views of Christian groups, and took advantage of the controversy "to stir religious sentiments for [the MIC's] political gains". The Tamil Nesan, the Makkal Osai's MIC-owned rival, was also accused by Makkal Osai of reshowing the offending caricature, as a poster-size enlargement held up by Peter s/o Sinnappan, in the 23 August edition of the Tamil Nesan.

The Makkal Osai resumed publishing on 24 September 2007.

=== April 2008 suspension ===
In April 2008, the Home Ministry decided against renewing the Makkal Osai's yearly publishing permit, resulting in a halt in the paper's publication for a week beginning 16 April 2008. Makkal Osai's previous permit expired 15 October 2007, the publication having submitted an application for renewal to the government on 16 July 2007. The paper continued publication with the understanding the application was in the process of being considered.

On 18 April, Home Minister Syed Hamid Albar denied allegations the paper was not given a license renewal due to its Opposition-centric stories, explaining Makkal Osai had breached some of its licensing guidelines, and claimed many complaints were made against the paper. Syed Hamid would later add in a 25 April report that the Home Ministry had merely delayed the approval for renewing its publishing licence and had not cancelled the paper's renewal. By 18 April, the government's move was criticised by members of the Democratic Action Party (DAP): secretary-general Lim Guan Eng expressed disappointment, implying the decision would be counter-productive in the ruling Barisan Nasional's efforts to win back supporters following the party's erosion of support in the 2008 general election; vice-chairman M. Kulasegaran described the ministry's decision as "unfair and unjust" and stated those who agreed upon to move must be held accountable for their actions.

Following an appeal by Makkal Osai, the government agreed to renew the paper's publishing permit on 24 April 2008, the paper made available again beginning 26 April. In the week Makkal Osai was suspended, the publication suffered about RM400,000 in losses but reported no resignation or termination of its staff.
