= Malaysia Nanban =

Newspaper in Malaysia

- Type: Daily newspaper
- Format: Broadsheet
- Founder: Dato Sikandar Batcha Abdul Majeed
- Publisher: Penerbitan Sahabat (M) Sdn. Bhd.
- President: Datin Zainam Rokiah Binti Abdullah
- Founded: 1 October 1986
- Language: Tamil
- Headquarters: 544-2 Batu Complex, Jalan Murai Off Jalan Ipoh 51200, Kuala Lumpur, Malaysia.
- Circulation: Weekdays 65,000 and Weekend 115,000
- Website: http://nanban.com.my/

Malaysia Nanban (Tamil: மலேசியா நண்பன், lit. 'Malaysia's Friend') is a Tamil daily newspaper based in Malaysia, one of only three Tamil-language dailies in the country, alongside the Makkal Osai and the now-defunct Tamil Nesan.
