= Audit Bureau of Circulations =

An Audit Bureau of Circulations is a private organization that provides industry-agreed standards for media brand measurement of print publications and other media outlets in a given country. The International Federation of Audit Bureaux of Circulations (IFABC) is an international federation of bureaux comprising member organisations in various countries. When discussed in the context of each country, the bureau may refer to:

- Audit Bureaux of Australia
- Hong Kong Audit Bureau of Circulations
- Japan Audit Bureau of Circulations
- Audit Bureau of Circulations (India)
- Alliance for Audited Media, formerly known as Audit Bureau of Circulations (North America)
- Audit Bureau of Circulations (Malaysia)
- Audit Bureau of Circulations (UK)
- Norwegian Audit Bureau of Circulations
