= The Rakyat Post =

Malaysian daily online newspaper

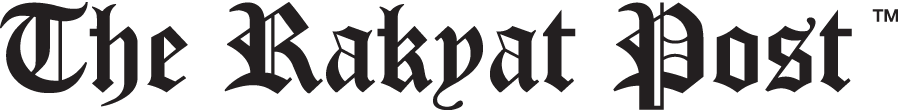
- Type: Daily online newspaper
- Format: Broadsheet
- Owner: 3rd Wave Media Sdn Bhd
- Managing editor: Hamzah Nazari
- Founded: October 2013
- Political alignment: Independent
- Price: Free
- Website: www.therakyatpost.com

The Rakyat Post (TRP) is an online newspaper in Malaysia.

It was founded in 2013, but ceased operations as a news portal in 2016.

In April 2019, it was relaunched as a non-news media organisation under different ownership and management.

== Controversy ==
=== Employers unpaid salaries ===
On 29 February 2016, the news was reported to have cease its operation following the non-payment of employers. On 10 March 2016, the news site reportedly resurfaced. The news site former employees who still did not get the payment of their salaries has made an official statement that they are not related on the "relaunch".

In June 2016, The Rakyat Post was acquired for an undisclosed sum by Malay Mail Sdn Bhd. As part of this acquisition, all former employees of The Rakyat Post were awarded a payout in line with Malaysian labor law requirements via the labor court. This was awarded in line with Section 69 of the Employment Act 1955.

== See also ==
- List of newspapers in Malaysia
