= Warta Negara =

North-Malaysian Malay-language newspaper

- Akhbar dari rakyat untuk rakyat
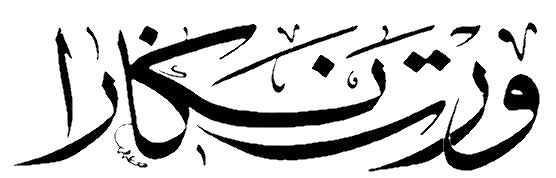

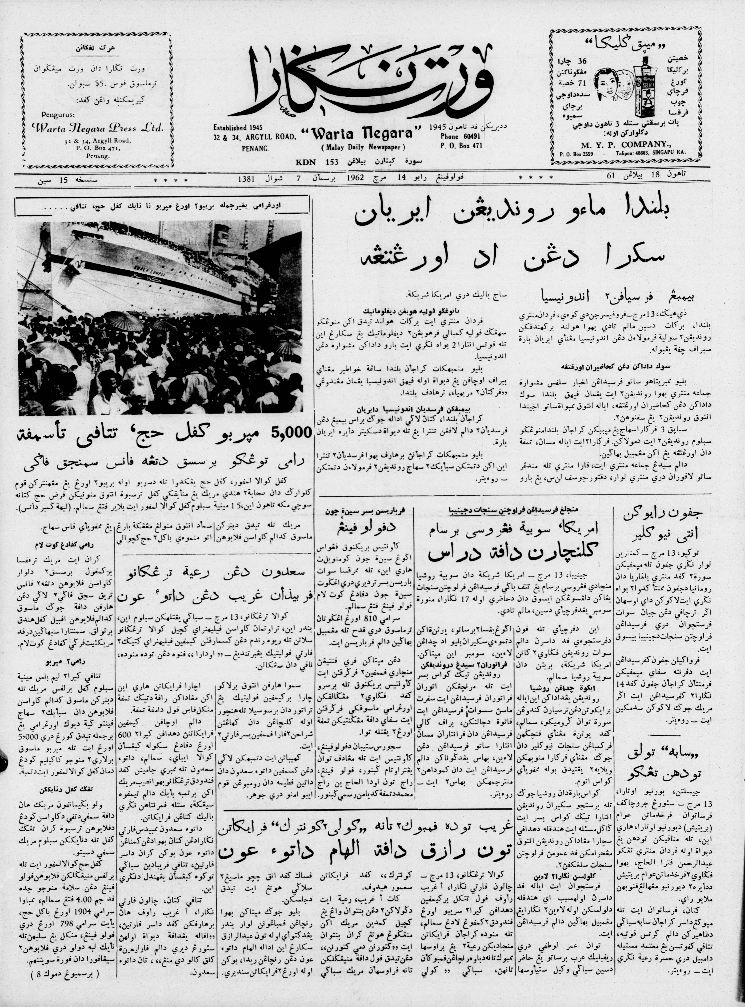
- Warta Negara (14 March 1962)
- Type: Daily newspaper
- Owners: Warta Negara Press Ltd. (1945–1964); The Utusan Group (1964–1969)
- Founder: Ahmad Jaliani
- Editor-in-chief: Ibrahim Mahmud (first); Osman Abadi (last)
- Founded: 3 September 1945
- Ceased publication: 13 July 1969
- Language: Malay
- Headquarters: 32 & 34 Argyll Road, Georgetown, Penang
- Country: British Malaya; Malaysia
- Circulation: 6,000 (1950s)

Warta Negara (English: National Gazette) was a north-Malaysian Malay-language daily newspaper written in Jawi script. It was first published in 1945. The newspaper was originally printed in four pages, but later editions included two-page and six-page formats. The newspaper mostly covered general stories and news reports of contemporary Malaya and early-Malaysia. The newspaper ceased publication in 1969.

== History ==
Warta Negara was first published in Penang on 3 September 1945 by Ahmad Jelani, a former staff of the Malayan-Japanese newspaper Penang Shimbun. The newspaper was printed by the Warta Negara Press from equipment purchased from former-Japanese printing houses. Warta Negara was the first newspaper published in Penang after the end of the Second World War. The daily used the slogan "Julung-julung Akhbar Harian Melayu diterbitkan dalam masa lepas Perang" ("The first Malay daily after the War"). Another slogan adopted was "Akhbar dari rakyat untuk rakyat" ("The people's daily for the people"). The newspaper was published entirely in Jawi script, and provided translated articles from English sources. In 1964, the newspaper was acquired by Utusan Melayu Press.

Daily circulation of the newspaper peaked at around 6,000 copies during the 1950s. Other contemporaries fared better, including Utusan Melayu (which sold 25,000 copies daily), and Melayu Raya (which peaked at 30,000 copies daily in 1950).

== Editors ==
The first editor of the Warta Negara was Ibrahim Mahmud, who was previously involved in the publication of several other prewar newspapers, notably Warta Malaya, Pemimpin Melayu, Warta Jenaka, Penang Shimbun, Pencharan Matahari, and later Malaya Merdeka. Mahmud was the editor until 1950 when he became involved in a magazine called Suara UMNO.

Mahmud was replaced by Abdul Wahab Zain, who remained in the position for seven years until 1957. During his tenure, he had published Warta Mingguan, a Sunday edition of Warta Negara that was published weekly.

Later editors include Ahmad Ismail/Ahmady Asmara (1957–1960); Ibrahim Legon (1961–1962); Salim Kajai (1963–1964) and Haji Jaafar Yusof (1964). In 1964, the Utusan Melayu Press bought the newspaper and appointed Harun Hassan as editor until 1967. Osman Abadi became the final editor for the newspaper until publication ceased in 1969.

List of editors of Warta Negara (1945–1969)
Editor	Appointed	Departed	Publishing company
Ibrahim Mahmud	1945	1950/1952	Warta Negara Press
Abdul Wahab Zain	1950–1952	1957	Warta Negara Press
Ahmad Ismail/Ahmady Asmara	1957	1960	Warta Negara Press
Ibrahim Legon	1961	1962	Warta Negara Press
Salim Kajai	1963	1964	Warta Negara Press
Haji Jaafar Yusof	1964	1964	Warta Negara Press
Harun Hassan	1964	1967	Utusan Melayu Press
Osman Abadi	1967	1969	Utusan Melayu Press

== Closure ==
All publications of Warta Negara ceased on 13 July 1969 to allow the Utusan Melayu Press to focus on the operations of Utusan Melayu.

== See also ==
- Berita Harian
- Utusan Malaysia
