= See Hua Daily News =

Chinese language newspaper in Malaysia

- Native name: 詩華日報
- Type: Daily newspaper
- Format: Print, online
- Owner: See Hua Group
- Editor-in-chief: Ling Kouk Kiong
- Founded: 1952; 74 years ago
- Language: Chinese
- Headquarters: 2nd floor, Crown Tower, Jalan Pending, 93450 Kuching, Sarawak.
- Sister newspapers: The Borneo Post; Utusan Borneo
- Website: www.seehua.com

See Hua Daily News (Chinese: 詩華日報) is a Chinese-language daily newspaper on the island of Borneo. It is circulated in the Sultanate of Brunei and the Malaysian states of Sarawak and Sabah, all on the northern coast of the island. Headquartered in Kuching, it has a current editorial staff of about 300.

== History ==
See Hua Daily News began publication in as a local newspaper in 1952. In its early days, it published as a large, two folio-sized paper published daily.

In April 2016, See Hua Daily News was criticized for a series of publications which labeled Taiwan a "fraud island," as well as criticizing the Taiwanese legal system. The publications were viewed by Chinese netizens as being overly subservient to the Chinese government, due to this stance on Taiwan.

In 2019, another controversy occurred following an editorial mandate stating that "China, Hong Kong, and Taiwan" should instead be written as "China, which includes Hong Kong and Taiwan." Following this, some See Hua Daily News employed went on strike to protest.

== Awards ==
In 2023, in the Kinabalu Press Award, See Hua Daily News won awards in the category of Chinese-language publications for Entertainment, Culture and Arts Reporting and Sports Journalism.
