= The Edge (Malaysia) =

Business newspaper in Malaysia

- Type: Daily & Weekly newspaper
- Format: Tabloid
- Owner(s): Tan Sri Tong Kooi Ong; The Edge Communications Sdn Bhd
- Editor: Kathy Fong
- Founded: 1994
- Language: English
- Headquarters: Level 3, Menara KLK, No. 1, Jalan PJU 7/6, Mutiara Damansara, 47810 Petaling Jaya, Selangor Darul Ehsan
- Website: theedgemalaysia.com

The Edge Media Group is the publisher of business and financial publications in Malaysia and Singapore, with headquarters in Petaling Jaya, Selangor, Malaysia. It is divided into four subsidiaries: The Edge Communications Sdn Bhd, publisher of The Edge Malaysia – a Business and investment weekly publication launched in 1994 available in both print and digital formats and The Edge CEO Morning Brief – a digital business and political news publication available every Tuesday-Friday morning, The Edge Publishing Pte Ltd, publisher of The Edge Singapore – a local newspaper with in-depth and analytical coverage on business and investments within Singapore and across the region, The Edge Property Sdn Bhd and The Edge Property Pte Ltd.

== History ==
On July 24, 2015, the Malaysian government suspended the publishing license of the Edge media group's two print publications, the Edge Weekly and the Edge Financial News, alleging that their coverage of the 1Malaysia Development Berhad threatened the country's national security and public order. The Edge's print publications were suspended for three months, beginning on 27 July 2015. The suspension of The Edge newspapers was criticized by several opposition politicians, the Institute of Journalists Malaysia, and business leaders, including the CIMB Group chairman Nazir Razak and Air Asia executive Tony Fernandes. On July 27, The Edge filed a judicial review challenging the ban.

In April 2023, The Edge Communications Sdn. Bhd. and its owner, Tan Sri Tong Kooi Ong, bought a stake in The Star Media Group, with Tong owning a direct interest of 0.25% stake and a 5.17% indirect interest through The Edge Communications.

== Circulation ==
The Edge Malaysia is audited by the Audit Bureau of Circulations. As of January 2014, it has an approximate circulation of 22,572. The Edge Malaysia caters to corporate executives and the general public with an interest in the Malaysian financial market and is distributed nationwide via newsstands.
