= Tamil Nesan =

Former Tamil language newspaper in Malaysia

Tamil Nesan தமிழ் நேசன்
- Type: Daily newspaper
- Owner: n/a
- Founded: 1924
- Ceased publication: 2019
- Language: Tamil
- Circulation: 20,000

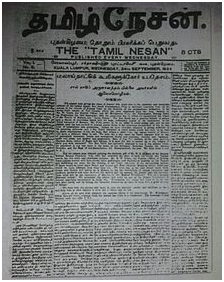
The first Tamil newspaper

The Tamil Nesan (Tamil: தமிழ் நேசன்) was a Tamil language newspaper published in Malaysia. Established in 1924, it was the oldest running Tamil newspaper in the country until its disestablishment in 2019.

First issued on 24 September 1924, the Tamil Nesan was a paper catering to the ethnic Indian community in Malaysia, primarily Tamilians, serving its readers with a variety of political, religious, nation, world, educational and Tamil cinema news. It was published daily and approximately 20,000 copies were sold every day. Like the Makkal Osai, the paper was affiliated with the Malaysian Indian Congress through its ownership by the family of former MIC president Samy Vellu.

The paper ceased publication on 1 February 2019, citing 10 years of financial difficulties.
