= The Borneo Post =

English language newspaper in Malaysia

- Front page on 22 August 2009
- Type: Daily newspaper
- Format: Berliner
- Publisher: Borneo Post Sdn Bhd
- Founded: 24 April 1978; 47 years ago
- Language: English
- Headquarters: KTS Crown Towers, Lot No. 88, Jalan Pending, 93450 Kuching, Sarawak
- City: Kuching; Sibu; Miri; Labuan; Kota Kinabalu; Sandakan; Tawau
- Country: Malaysia
- Circulation: 65,990 (daily); 22,971 (Sabah version); 70,073 (The Sunday Post) (as of January–June 2015)
- Sister newspapers: Utusan Borneo; See Hua Daily News
- OCLC number: 488800331
- Website: theborneopost.com

The Borneo Post, established in 1978, is the largest and widely circulated English-language daily newspaper in East Malaysia and also the alternately circulated newspaper in Brunei (as a strong competitor to the main existing newspapers of Pelita Brunei, Borneo Bulletin and also Media Permata, to a lesser extent, the now-defunct Brunei Times). The newspaper is the first English newspaper in East Malaysia to use photo-composition for type-setting and printing was done in offset as against the old-fashioned letterpress.

== Overview ==
The first issue of The Borneo Post was circulated on 24 April 1978 and the newspaper is the brainchild of the late Datuk Lau Hui Siong, while its name was given by the late Datuk Robert Lau Hoi Chew, the former Sibu MP and federal deputy transport minister as well as former federal deputy housing minister cum one-time chairperson of the Sibu Municipal Council. Although The Borneo Post is today headquartered in Crown Towers, Kuching, the paper first began in the timber industry town of Sibu. The newspaper's expansion began firstly in the state capital city of Kuching on 29 October 1979 and later in 1986 to the oil-producing hub of Miri and the neighbouring state of Sabah as well as the Federal Territory of Labuan and Brunei Darussalam, made The Borneo Post, the most widely distributed English newspaper in Borneo (East Malaysia and Brunei). In 2007, the news portal website was launched to capture a larger pool of younger readers. The newspaper has around five to seven printing plants located throughout Sarawak, Labuan as well as Sabah. As of April 2023, the newspaper is printed daily in Kuching, Sibu and Miri in Sarawak, whilst in Sabah and the island federal territory of Labuan, it is printed in Kota Kinabalu as well as in Sandakan, Tawau, Labuan and also Lahad Datu and the newspaper is also widely circulated in the independent state of Brunei Darussalam.

== Circulation ==
Audited circulation figures by Audit Bureau of Circulations Malaysia for January–June 2015, the newspaper is the highest circulated English newspaper in Sarawak, with a circulation of 65,990 (daily) and 70,073 (the Sunday Post). For the same period, the Sabah edition of the newspaper reached a circulation of 22,971 copies.

== Sister publications ==
In 1986, The Borneo Post incorporated a Bahasa Malaysia section which this was later expanded into a full-fledged newspaper – Utusan Borneo (it is a separate newspaper in Sarawak but a short-lived publication cum pull-out page for the Sabah edition). The Borneo Post has two sister publications; Utusan Borneo and See Hua Daily News.

=== Utusan Borneo ===
Utusan Borneo is a Malay-Iban (for the Sabah edition, it is bilingual in Malay and Kadazan-Dusun language) newspaper published by Harian Borneo Post Sdn Bhd. Based on audited circulation figures by Audit Bureau of Circulations Malaysia for January–June 2015, daily circulation for the Utusan Borneo (Sarawak) of 36,251 copies in Sarawak. It is the highest circulated Malay newspaper in Sarawak and one of the top circulating local newspapers in Sabah (but now it is a pull-out section of the Sabah edition of The Borneo Post paper since 2020).

== Features ==
- The Borneo Post Seeds - a section to cater issues related to youth readers.
- BAT5 - Borneo Post Adventure Team. The team travels across Sarawak and share with the readers on interesting places that they have encountered.

== Reception ==
In June 2018, Reuters Institute's Digital News Report 2018 ranked The Borneo Post third in terms of brand trust of users of the brand behind first placed Astro Awani and international news website Yahoo! News. A 2020 Reuters Institute poll found that 47% of Malaysian respondents trusted reporting from The Borneo Post - the seventh highest out of the 14 media outlets surveyed.

== Awards ==
Year	Award	Category	Nominated work	Result
2017	Malaysian National News Agency's (Bernama) Golden Jubilee	Special Award for Loyal Bernama Customers (Media)	"The Borneo Post"	Won
2019	Construction Industry Development Board (CIDB) Media Awards	Print Media and News Portal	A four-part-feature on the Papar Dam (Note: Four-part feature titled "RM170 to address NRW", "Amicable solution to address environmentalists' concerns on proposed Papar Dam", "Dams have to be built" and "Papar Dam to supply water, power to West Coast".) by Neil Brian Joseph	Second Place
2019	Construction Industry Development Board (CIDB) Media Awards	Print Media and News Portal	"Mediation usually suggested in construction disputes" by Mariah Airiens Doksil	Third Place
2024	Kinabalu Press Awards	Entertainment, Culture and Arts Reporting Award (English)	Sabahan tells stories through art by Mariah Airiens Doksil	Won
2024	Kinabalu Press Awards	Sports Journalism Award (English)	A glimpse of Japanese martial arts and culture by Elton Aaron Gomes	Won

== See also ==
- List of newspapers in Malaysia
- New straits times
