= Daily Express (Malaysia) =

Daily newspaper in East Malaysia

- Logo of Daily Express (Malaysia)
- Type: Daily newspaper
- Format: Berliner
- Publisher: Sabah Publishing House Sdn. Bhd
- Founded: 1 March 1963
- Political alignment: Independent
- Language: English, Malay
- Headquarters: Kota Kinabalu, Sabah, Malaysia
- Circulation: 33,790 (daily); July–December 2013
- Website: dailyexpress.com.my

The Daily Express is an English-language newspaper in Sabah, Malaysia and the sister newspaper of the Overseas Chinese Daily News (OCDN). It is the largest daily newspaper in Sabah with an average circulation of 33,790 copies daily.

== History ==
The newspaper was founded by Tan Sri Yeh Pao Tzu and it was first issued on 1 March 1963. It is published in English, Malay and Kadazan. It is promoted as the "Independent National Newspaper of East Malaysia".
