= New Sarawak Tribune =

Newspaper in Malaysia

- Type: Daily newspaper
- Format: Print, online
- Owner: Sarawak Press Sdn Bhd
- Founder: Teachers in 1945
- Ceased publication: 2006
- Relaunched: 2010 as the New Sarawak Tribune
- Political alignment: Gabungan Parti Sarawak (unofficial)
- Language: English
- City: Kuching, Sibu and Bintulu
- Country: Sarawak
- Website: www.newsarawaktribune.com.my

The New Sarawak Tribune is an English-language Malaysian newspaper published in Kuching, Sibu and Bintulu, in Sarawak that was relaunched after the suspension of the Sarawak Tribune following the publication of the Jyllands-Posten Muhammad cartoons.

== Overview and history ==
Originally formed by teachers in 1945, the Sarawak Tribune was the second English-language daily in Sarawak and was, prior to its suspension, the state's oldest and largest operating state daily, with over 400 employees throughout the state and 70 editorial staff in Kuching. The daily was regarded as a legacy of British colonial Sarawak. Its sister paper was the state Malay-language daily, Utusan Sarawak. Formerly, its other sister paper was the state Mandarin daily, Chinese Daily News, now known as United Daily. It was last owned by Sarawak Press Sdn Bhd.

=== 2006 Muhammad cartoons controversy ===
During the Jyllands-Posten Muhammad cartoons controversy, the daily reprinted a collection of the cartoons on page 17 of the 4 February 2006 edition to illustrate a story on the topic titled "Cartoon No Big Impact Here". The publication drew flak from the Malaysian government, which consisted predominantly of Muslim politicians. As a result, Lester Melanyi, an editor of the newspaper, resigned from his post for allowing the reprinting of the cartoon.

Company advisor Senator Datuk Idris Buang announced that the daily would choose to suspend itself. The paper was officially suspended on 9 February 2006. The group editor, Toman Mamora, resigned soon after. The daily's indefinite suspension has been generally described as a loss.

=== 2025 Anas al-Sharif headline controversy ===
In August 2025, the daily attracted controversy when an article was published by the newspaper with the headlines, "Militant Using Press Cover Eliminated." It turned out that the person referred to as a “militant” was actually Anas Al-Sharif, a journalist from Al Jazeera who was killed in Gaza along with four other journalists by Israeli forces on 10 August. Upon realizing the error, the newspaper issued an immediate apology. In its statement, the daily expressed regret to Anas Al-Sharif's family, colleagues, and the media community. It also reaffirmed its opposition to the killing and suppression of journalists anywhere in the world.

In response, National Trust Party condemned the headline and accused the newspaper of spreading lies about al-Sharif. The political party also requested the Ministry of Home Affairs and the Malaysian Communications and Multimedia Commission to take action against the tribune.

== Successor ==
A new tabloid, the Eastern Times, is said to have replaced the Sarawak Tribune. Its printing license was approved on 1 March, and began publication on 26 March 2006.

The Eastern Times is owned by Total Progressive Sdn Bhd, a subsidiary of a real-estate developing corporation and government-linked company, Naim Cendera Holdings Bhd. The company was renamed Eastern Times News Sdn Bhd in May 2006.
