= Steven Gan =

Malaysian journalist (born 1963)

- 颜重庆
- Born: 10 November 1962 (age 63); Bentong, Pahang
- Occupation: Journalist
- Known for: Founder of Malaysiakini
- Awards: International Press Freedom Award (2000) Free Media Pioneer Award (2001)

Steven Gan (simplified Chinese: 颜重庆; traditional Chinese: 顏重慶; pinyin: Yán Chóngqìng; Jyutping: Ngaan4 Cung4 Hing3; Pe̍h-ōe-jī: Gân Tiông-khìng; born 1962) is a Malaysian journalist known for co-founding and editing the political news website Malaysiakini (English: "Malaysia Today"), Malaysia's "first and only" independent news source.

In 2000, he was awarded the International Press Freedom Award of the Committee to Protect Journalists (CPJ).

== Early years ==
Steven Gan was born in 1962 in Ketari, a small new village near Bentong in Pahang. Gan's father was a poor immigrant originating from the Fujian province of China, and worked as a bus conductor. His mother was a primary school teacher at a Chinese school. Unlike her husband, Gan's mother came from a relatively better-off Cantonese family.

Speaking on his childhood in a Malaysiakini interview, he described his father as being "quite dictatorial". At the age of 14, Gan ran away from home, living on the streets of Kuala Lumpur before he was coaxed back into his studies by his uncle. He would go on to receive a pre-college degree at a technical college in Perth, with the help of the same relative.

With ambitions of becoming an architect, Gan read architecture at the University of New South Wales (UNSW). His dream was to learn how to build "nice but affordable" low-cost housing from local materials such as bamboo.

It was at UNSW where he joined the Overseas Student Collective. He credited the collective with having "radicalised" him and pushing him towards writing. In 1983, he was elected the university's overseas student director.

He would go on to help form a state-wide organisation of overseas students, followed by a national organisation - with former Batu MP Chua Tian Chang (better known as Tian Chua) and former Bukit Lanjan state assemblyperson Elizabeth Wong.

The Overseas Student Collective focused on a number of matters related to "fees, racism, loneliness, and language".

After spending five years in Sydney, Gan moved to Melbourne, where he studied philosophy, economics and political science. During this time, he remained active in the Overseas Student Collective, where he soon met Premesh Chandran, a physics student in UNSW.

== Work in print journalism ==
Gan received a degree in political economy from an Australian university in 1989. He began his journalistic career in print, as a freelancer for a Hong Kong–based newspaper. In 1991, he covered the Gulf War from Baghdad. In 1994, he returned to Malaysia, where he became a reporter for the new Malaysian daily The Sun. There he struggled against both government regulation and the self-censorship of The Sun's editors.

In 1995, he led a team of reporters that discovered that 59 inmates, primarily Bangladeshis, had died in the Semenyih immigration detention camp of the preventable diseases typhoid and beriberi. When Gan's editors refused to publish the story for fear of government reprisal, Gan passed the information to the immigrant rights organisation Tenaganita. Tenaganita publicised the reporters' findings, and its director, Irene Fernandez, was subsequently threatened with imprisonment for "publishing false news". Fernandez's trials and appeals from the case would last thirteen years, ending in her 2008 acquittal by the Kuala Lumpur Criminal High Court.

In 1996, Gan was arrested, along with four other reporters, at the 1996 Asia Pacific Conference on East Timor. During the five days he spent in jail, he was named a prisoner of conscience by Amnesty International. After his release, he wrote a column protesting his arrest and treatment, but his editors refused to publish it. Gan resigned in protest, going on to write editorials for the English-language Thai daily The Nation.

== Malaysiakini ==
Though Malaysian law had provided for strict government controls on print media since 1984, the Malaysia Multimedia Super Corridor, an initiative to encourage technological development in Malaysia, was launched in 1995. A founding principle of the project was that government censorship of the Internet would not be permitted. Seeing a loophole, Gan and colleague Premesh Chandran decided to found an online news resource that would be free of the controls placed on print media.

The pair founded Malaysiakini.com in November 1999, with a staff of four other journalists and a starting budget of $100,000. Gan served as its editor-in-chief. For its first story, Malaysiakini posted a report on 20 November criticising the practices of Sin Chew Daily, Malaysia's largest-circulation Chinese-language newspaper. Sin Chew Daily had doctored a photograph of Malaysia's ruling party to remove Anwar Ibrahim, who had recently been imprisoned for corruption. According to BBC News, the Malaysiakini report led to "worldwide infamy" for Sin Chew Daily, and the newspaper later issued a public apology. In April 2001, Malaysiakini made news again when it discovered and reported the secret detention of 10 political activists.

Within a year, the site had nearly 100,000 visitors a day, making it one of the most popular news sites in Malaysia; it had also expanded to a full-time staff of twelve. In January 2012, Alexa Internet ranked it as the 14th most popular website in the country. However, attracting advertising was often a challenge for the website, which Gan blamed on collusion between Malaysian politicians and businesspeople.

== Government responses to Malaysiakini ==
Prime Minister Mahathir Mohamad described the Malaysiakini staff as "traitors" and suggested that the paper was funded by financier George Soros, whose currency speculation the Prime Minister blamed for the 1997 Asian financial crisis that had devastated Malaysia's economy.

In a 2002 article in Nieman Reports, Gan stated that Malaysiakini was repeatedly hacked during the first years of its existence. Citing a government statement to launch "missiles" at opposition websites, Gan speculated that the Malaysian government was behind the cyberattacks. The website suffered further cyber-attacks in April and July 2011, coinciding with an election in Sarawak and the pro-electoral reform Bersih 2.0 rally; again Gan alleged that the government was responsible.

On 20 January 2003, police raided the Malaysiakini office and confiscated its servers and 15 newsroom computers, costing an estimated RM150,000 (US$40,000). The raid followed a call by the youth wing of the right-wing political party UMNO to investigate the site for sedition after it published a letter criticising the government's pro-Malay quotas in hiring and scholarships. The website was able to go back online ten hours after the raid.

== Awards and recognition ==
Gan was awarded one of the 2000 CPJ International Press Freedom Awards, along with Željko Kopanja of Bosnia and Herzegovina, Modeste Mutinga of the Democratic Republic of Congo, and Mashallah Shamsolvaezin of Iran. The CPJ describes the award as "an annual recognition of courageous journalism".

In July 2001, Businessweek named Gan one of the "Stars of Asia" in the category "Opinion Shapers". Later that year, Malaysiakini won a Free Media Pioneer award from the International Press Institute.
