= Irene Fernandez =

Malaysian human rights activist (1946–2014)

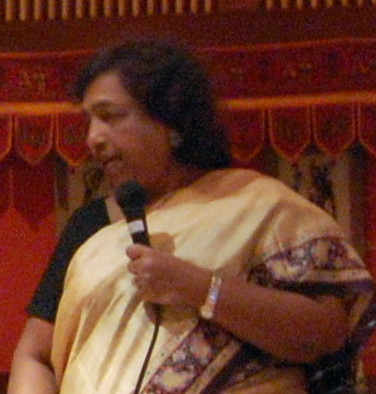
- Fernandez in 2008

Personal details
- Born: Irene Fernandez; 18 April 1946 Malaysia
- Died: 31 March 2014 (aged 67) Petaling Jaya, Selangor, Malaysia
- Citizenship: Malaysian
- Party: People's Justice Party
- Occupation: Human rights activist Politician
- Awards: Right Livelihood Award

Irene Fernandez (18 April 1946 – 31 March 2014) was a Malaysian human rights activist and politician.

She was a member of the People's Justice Party (KeADILan) and the director and co-founder of the non-governmental organization Tenaganita, which promotes the rights of migrant workers and refugees in Malaysia.

In 2003, she was convicted of publishing fake news relating to the abuse and deaths of migrant workers and sentenced to a year's imprisonment. The conviction was overturned in 2008.

She was honoured with the Right Livelihood Award in 2005.

== Biography ==
In 1995, Irene Fernandez published a report on the living conditions of the migrant workers entitled "Abuse, Torture and Dehumanised Conditions of Migrant Workers in Detention Centres". The report was based in part on information given to her by Steven Gan and a team of reporters from The Sun, who had uncovered evidence that 59 inmates, primarily Bangladeshis, had died in the Semenyih immigration detention camp of the preventable diseases typhoid and beriberi. When Gan and his colleagues were blocked by The Sun editors from printing the report in the paper, they passed it to Fernandez.

She was arrested in 1996 and charged with 'maliciously publishing false news' under the Printing Presses and Publications Act 1984. She was found guilty in 2003 and convicted to one year's imprisonment in 2003 following a seven-year trial, the longest in Malaysian history up to that point.

Released on bail pending her appeal, her passport was held by the courts, and as a convicted criminal, she was barred from standing as parliamentary candidate in the 2004 Malaysian elections.

In 2005, she was awarded the Right Livelihood Award for "her outstanding and courageous work to stop violence against women and abuses of migrant and poor workers".

Irene Fernandez's appeal at the High Court resumed on 28 October 2008. On 24 November 2008, Justice Mohamed Apandi Ali overturned her earlier conviction and acquitted her, ending the thirteen-year case.

She died on 31 March 2014 of heart failure.

== Election results ==
Parliament of Malaysia: P107 Subang, Selangor
Year	Opposition	Votes	Pct	Government	Votes	Pct	Ballots cast	Majority	Turnout
1999	Irene Fernandez (KeADILan)	28,985	44.51%	K.S. Nijhar (MIC)	36,137	55.49%	67,847	7,152	73.11%

== See also ==
- Illegal immigrants in Malaysia
