= Malaysiakini =

Online news portal published in English, Malay, Chinese and Tamil

Malaysiakini 当今大马 மலேசியாகினி
- Type: Online media
- Founders: Steven Gan; Premesh Chandran
- Publisher: Mkini Group Sdn Bhd
- Editor-in-chief: Andrew Ong
- Founded: 20 November 1999; 26 years ago
- Language: English; Malay; Mandarin; Tamil
- Headquarters: PJ 51, 9, Jalan 51/205a Off Jalan Tandang, PJS 51, 46050, Petaling Jaya, Selangor
- Website: malaysiakini.com

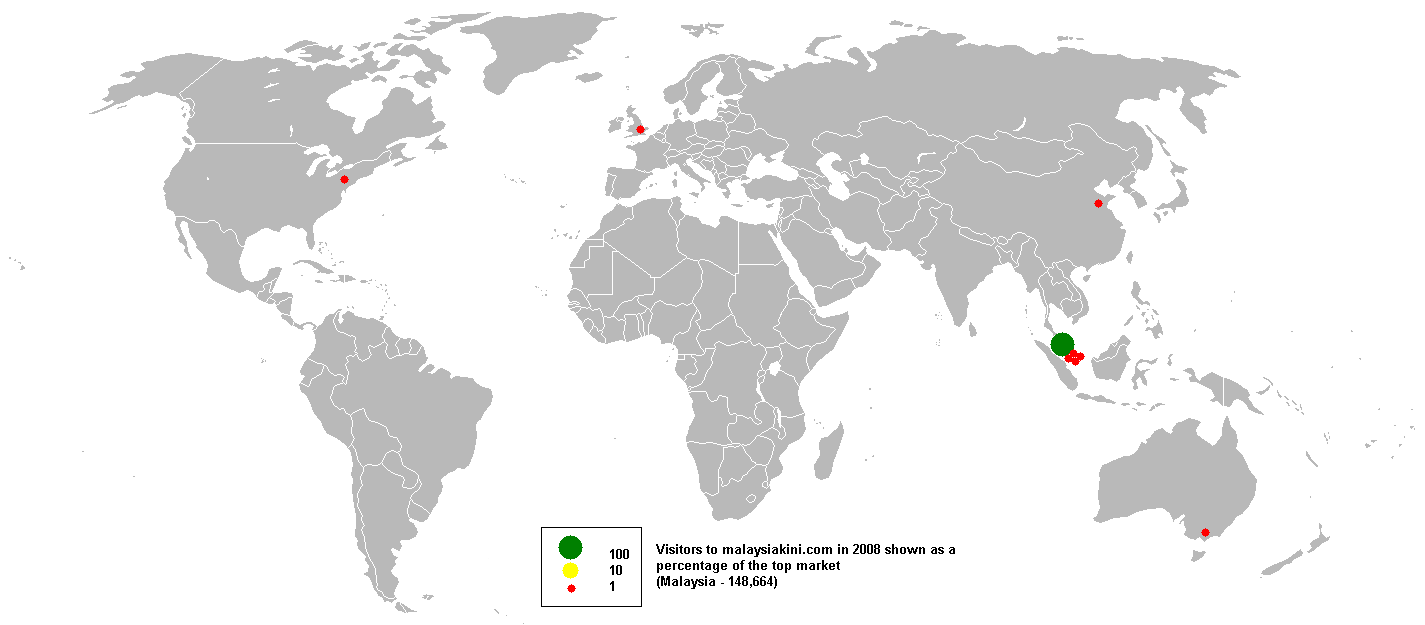
Visitors to malaysiakini.com in 2008

Malaysiakini (English: "Malaysia Now") is an online news portal in Malaysia which was established in 1999. It is published in Malay, English, Chinese and Tamil, and is among the most read news portals in Malaysia.

At the time of its founding in 1999, traditional print and broadcast media were tightly regulated and controlled by the Barisan Nasional government. Malaysiakini claimed it would try to achieve an independent voice without interference and restrictions from shareholders, advertisers or the government.

Malaysiakini is unaffiliated with Malaysianow – a much smaller news website that uses the English translation of Malaysiakini as its name.

== History ==
=== Founding ===
Malaysiakini was founded by Premesh Chandran and Steven Gan in November 1999. Frustrated with the constraints they experienced while working for The Sun newspaper, Premesh and Gan decided to use the Multimedia Super Corridor (MSC) pledge to create a space for uncensored journalism.

The site began with a staff of five journalists and a starting budget of $100,000, raised with the initial versions of the publication prepared by Premesh. Premesh was CEO, and Gan was editor-in-chief.

For its first story, Malaysiakini posted a report on 20 November 1999 criticising the practices of Sin Chew Daily, Malaysia's largest-circulation Chinese-language newspaper. It reported that Sin Chew Daily had doctored a photograph of Malaysia's ruling party to remove the image of former deputy prime minister Anwar Ibrahim, who then had recently been imprisoned for corruption.

According to BBC News, the Malaysiakini report led to "worldwide infamy" for Sin Chew Daily, and the newspaper later issued a public apology.

=== Scoop on 2001 ISA detentions ===
In April 2001, Malaysiakini made news again when it discovered and reported the secret detention of 10 political activists for participating in a rally in favour of the imprisoned Anwar Ibrahim.

=== Police raid ===
On 20 January 2003, Malaysiakini was raided by the Royal Malaysia Police (PDRM). Four servers and 15 personal computers from its office worth RM150,000 (US$39,500) were seized during the raid. The police raid was instigated after the right-wing cadres in UMNO Youth, the youth wing of the ruling United Malays National Organisation (UMNO), complained that a letter written by "Petrof", a reader, and published on Malaysiakini's website was seditious.

In its police report, UMNO Youth claimed that the letter had questioned the special rights and privileges of the Bumiputras that are enshrined in the Constitution. Additionally, UMNO Youth claimed that the letter also contained false allegations that the Malaysian government was unfair to other ethnic races in the country. The seizure of the hardware temporarily halted Malaysiakini's operation, though it eventually resumed its normal operations.

=== Publishing fake news as April's fool joke ===
On 1 April 2005, Malaysiakini published a fake news report alleging four unnamed senior government officials were being charged with corruption. The report was revealed to be an April Fool's joke, albeit published to spotlight official corruption, a problem still rife in Malaysia. This resulted in with some readers expressing their disappointment at the editorial and the government ordering a probe on the news organisation.

=== Abdul Taib Mahmud bribery allegation ===
In May 2007, the news portal was sued for defamation by then Chief Minister of Sarawak, Abdul Taib Mahmud in the Kuala Lumpur High Court. He demanded an apology, an unspecified amount of damages and an injunction against Malaysiakini and Gan, for 12 articles published between 6 April and 3 May that year. The suit was retracted in January 2012 after the news portal made an apology in public court for publishing unverified news.

=== Print permit rejection ===
Malaysiakini applied in 2010 for a license to circulate its content in print as a newspaper, which was rejected by the Home Ministry. It successfully appealed in the High Court and the High Court judged that Malaysiakini was to be issued a publication permit. The Home Ministry appealed the High Court decision in the Court of Appeal. The appeal was dismissed. Legally victorious, the newspaper requested the Home Ministry again for a permit. However, the application was rejected again. Eventually Malaysiakini decided it was no longer desirable to print a newspaper.

=== Raub Australian Gold Mine suit ===
Malaysiakini was sued in 2012 for publishing several articles and videos about residents' concerns over pollution allegedly linked to Raub Australian Gold Mine's gold mining operations in Malaysia. The company had said the articles were defamatory and malicious.

The Kuala Lumpur High Court in 2016 ruled in favour of Malaysiakini on the grounds of responsible journalism and reportage, but the decision was later overturned on appeal. The Federal Court upheld the appellate court's decision in a 3–2 majority ruling, saying Malaysiakini had not been "fair, disinterested or adopted a neutral approach" in reporting the residents' campaign against the mining activities.

On 2 July 2021, the Federal Court of Malaysia ordered Malaysiakini to pay RM550,000 (US$132,180) in damages to Raub Australian Gold Mine which by then had become defunct.

=== Funding source ===
In September 2012, Malaysiakini admitted to receiving grants from National Endowment for Democracy (NED) and other organisations. Premesh Chandran, the CEO of Malaysiakini said that Malaysiakini is "transparent about such partnerships" and that the foreign grants "form a small part of Malaysiakini budget". He also said that Malaysiakini is 70% owned by its co-founders and staff. He claimed that despite receiving grants from international donors, the editorial independence was not compromised. Other than Malaysiakini, other organisations and human right groups in Malaysia such as SUARAM also reportedly having received funding from the NED.

In 2016, Malaysiakini's former editor YL Chong claimed that George Soros indirectly funded the online news portal and that the online news portal refused to allow this fact to be known and that he had resigned in protest. Malaysiakini refuted these allegations. Malaysiakini was probed by the government as a result.

As of 2026, Malaysiakini lists foreign funders such as NED and the New York-based Media Development Investment Fund on its website.

=== Red paint attack ===
On 25 February 2014, red paint was splashed outside Malaysiakini's then office premise at Bangsar Utama, Kuala Lumpur. A cardboard box with a duck inside was left at the main entrance. The box had a photograph of DAP's Seputeh MP Teresa Kok strapped to it. The act was perceived as a threat to Malaysiakini and its staff.

=== Zunar sedition charge ===
In 2015, political cartoonist Zunar (Zulkiflee Anwar Haque) whose work has run in Malaysiakini for many years, was charged under the Sedition Act 1948 for criticising the Malaysian government in a number of posts on Twitter and was charged under the Sedition Act 1948. The charges were dropped after the change of government in 2018.

=== Jamal Yunos protest ===
On 5 November 2016, right-wing Umno leader Jamal Yunos led a group of his Red Shirt protesters to the entrance of the news portal's new office premises in Petaling Jaya. They called for Malaysiakini to be closed down but stopped at a (temporary) police barricade and eventually left.

=== Tajuddin defamation suit ===
On 26 April 2017, Pasir Salak MP Tajuddin Abdul Rahman filed a defamation suit against Shah Alam MP Khalid Abdul Samad, Malaysiakini subsidiary KiniTV and the New Straits Times Press Bhd (NSTP)

He claimed that Khalid had uttered defamatory statements laced with curse words at two media conferences held at the Parliament lobby in 2016.

On 22 February 2022 the KL High Court dismissed Tajuddin’s suit without costs.

On 19 October 2023 the Court of Appeal ordered Tajuddin to pay a total of RM120,000 in costs to Khalid and KiniTV Sdn Bhd. NSTP was not part of the appeal.

=== Contempt of court over readers' comments ===
On 19 February 2021, Malaysiakini was found guilty of contempt by the Federal Court of Malaysia over five user comments posted on the website that the Malaysian Attorney General claimed undermined public confidence in the judiciary. The news website was fined RM 500,000 Malaysian ringgit (US$123,644). However, Malaysiakini's editor-in-chief Steven Gan was not found guilty of the offence. The website sought public donations to pay the fine and received donation exceeding the fine amount within the span of roughly four hours.

In covering the trial, the BBC in an article called 'Malaysiakini: The upstart that changed Malaysia's media landscape' said that "Malaysiakini's success so far, its very survival, are all the more remarkable in a country where all news media was once subject to government control, and in a region where truly independent, quality journalism is difficult, dangerous and often driven to the margins."

The New York Times meanwhile wrote a piece called 5 Reader Comments Just Cost a News Website $124,000 in which they wrote that Gan and Malaysiakini were being punished for the outlet’s diligent reporting. It quoted Gan as saying that the court's decision would "have a tremendous chilling impact on discussions of issues of public interest and it delivers a body blow to our continual campaign to fight corruption."

=== Leadership transition ===
In August 2022, co-founder Premesh stepped back from his role as Malaysiakini's chief executive officer.

Similarly, after leading Malaysiakini’s newsroom for 23 years, Gan stepped down as editor-in-chief in January 2023.

While the co-founders had reduced roles in the daily running of the news portal, the duo continued to sit on Malaysiakini's board of directors and remained the company's largest individual shareholders.

After their departure, the editorial team was led by executive editor RK Anand and managing editor Ng Ling Fong.

=== Asia Mobiliti ===
In May 2024, the Selangor government was accused of alleged nepotism in the Demand Responsive Transit (DRT) programme, over the selection of Asia Mobility Technologies Sdn Bhd (Asia Mobiliti) as one of two companies chosen for the trial project. Asia Mobiliti, selected for the nine-month DRT trial in Selangor is co-owned by Ramachandran Muniandy, the husband of Youth and Sports Minister Hannah Yeoh, and ex-Malaysiakini CEO Premesh Chandran.

Premesh, who was still a leading shareholder in Malaysiakini, dismissed allegations of nepotism and argued an open tender was unsuitable because there were only two companies with the necessary Apad registration to participate in Selangor’s proof of concept trial.

=== Retrenchment ===
In October 2024, in advance of the company’s 25th anniversary, the new leadership of Anand and head of operations Tham Seen Hau announced a restructuring exercise which included job cuts.

=== Bribery charge ===
Malaysiakini journalist B Nantha Kumar was charged on March 14, 2025 for allegedly receiving a RM20,000 bribe as inducement to not do further news reports on migrant syndicates.

He was charged under the MACC Act at the Shah Alam Sessions Court after being detained following a sting operation in which he was captured accepting the money.

In his version of events published on Malaysiakini Nantha said that he was attempting to capture further proof of the migrant syndicates’ wrongdoings.

He admitted that in the course of doing so, he did take possession of the money. He also said that he had neglected to inform Malaysiakini’s editors of his plans.

=== RM3million fund diversion ===
On March 5, 2026, Malaysiakini announced that representatives of its board had filed a police report concerning the diversion of RM3 million from its subsidiaries to third-party entities suspected of running unlicensed investment schemes.

It announced that the diversion of funds happened between March 2023 and March 2024 and that it had been enabled by former key employees of the company.

Premesh and Gan said in a statement that a police report had been filed over the matter.

=== Police raid in OSA probe ===
On April 27, 2026 police raided the home of Malaysiakini journalist B Nantha Kumar in connection with an investigation into an article concerning a proposed migrant worker recruitment system.

He was believed to be in possession of copies - both physical and material - of official documents such as the cabinet memorandum titled ‘Proposal for the Implementation of the Digital System The Universal Recruitment Advanced Platform (Turap) in the Process of Recruiting Foreign Workers to Malaysia.

Possessing such documents would violate the Official Secrets Act but police did not find or seize any items.

=== New editor-in-chief ===
On August 12, 2026 owner Steven Gan announced that long-serving staff Andrew Ong had been appointed Editor-In-Chief. The position supersedes that of previous editorial leaders Ng Ling Fong and RK Anand.

== Awards and recognition ==
In 2001, Malaysiakini won a Free Media Pioneer award from the International Press Institute.

Gan himself won a 2000 International Press Freedom Award of the Committee to Protect Journalists, "an annual recognition of courageous journalism". In July 2001, Businessweek named him one of the "Stars of Asia" in the category "Opinion Shapers" for his work with the website.

In 2014, it received Social Media Award during Worldwide Bloggers and Social Media Award 2014 in Kuala Lumpur.

Through the years, Malaysiakini has won various awards and accolades from the International Press Institute, Reporters Sans Frontiers, Committee to Protect Journalists, Asiaweek and Businessweek.

The news portal developed a reputation for providing a platform for academics and writers such as Jomo Kwame Sundram, Farish A. Noor, Faisal Tehrani, Uthaya Sankar SB, Ranjit Singh Malhi and Wong Chin Huat to reach a wider audience.

Columnists have also included activist Hishamuddin Rais, independent preacher Wan Ji Wan Hussin and award-winning investigative journalist R. Nadeswaran. Additionally, Malaysiakini associate editor Martin Vengadesan was named best columnist in the 2022 Malaysian Press Institute Journalism awards.

The news portal's special reports on issues such as the 50th anniversary of the May 13 riots, environmental exposes and presentations on Budgets and elections, have frequently garnered multimedia awards at local and regional award ceremonies.

In November 2021, Malaysiakini reporter Wong Kai Hui won Thomson Foundation Young Journalist Award, chosen from almost 200 entrants from 55 countries.

Malaysiakini journalist S Vinothaa was awarded Indonesia’s prestigious Hassan Wirajuda Protection Award 2022 for her reporting on issues affecting its citizens in Malaysia.

She was the first foreign journalist to receive the award and the second Malaysian to be recognised by the country since the inception of the annual event in 2015.

In November 2023, academic Janet Steele published Malaysiakini and the Power of Independent Media in Malaysia, a book detailing the company's journey and impact.

In June 2024, Malaysiakini won its first Kajai Award in addition to two gold prizes at the MPI Journalism Awards 2023.

The top award in Malaysian journalism went to journalist S Vinothaa and the news lab team of Ooi Choon Nam and Affan Amrish Mohd Jalani for their contribution to the three-part series on how stateless children in Sabah have been forcibly taken from their parents and put up for adoption.

Vinothaa also won first place in the “Best Investigative Journalism” category for her report titled “Exposed: Shackles of rampant modern-day slave trading”.

For the “Best Multimedia Journalism” category, the first place went to Malaysiakini for its report on the 2023 state elections titled “State polls: How far can the ‘Green Wave’ go?”

Malaysiakini then won the Society of Publishers in Asia (Sopa) 2024 Award for excellence in reporting on women’s issues.

The award was granted to S Vinothaa, Ooi Choon Nam, Aidila Razak and Affan Amrish Mohd Jalani for their contribution to “Baby snatching: How stateless mums lose their infants in Sabah hospital”.

In June 2025, Malaysiakini won four gold medals at the MPI for Best Video Talkshow; Best Multimedia; Best Environmental, Social and Governance (ESG) Reporting; and Best Investigative Reporting. The latter was won by S Vinothaa for a story on cancer in Orang Asli youth living near iron ore mines in Kampung Kelaik, Gua Musang.

The same story won the Sopa 2025 Award for excellence in reporting on human rights issues, making Vinothaa the most frequent award winner at Malaysiakini.

In 2026, Malaysiakini’s video team won the Sopa award for excellence in environment reporting for a story on Malaysia’s data centre boom.

On July 18, 2026, B Nantha Kumar won the Best Investigative Reporting award at the MPI-Petronas Malaysia Journalism Awards 2025 for his story on a syndicate at the Kuala Lumpur International Airport involving civil servants travelling abroad without immigration records.

== See also ==
- Steven Gan
- Zulkiflee Anwar Haque
- Wong Chin Huat
- Wan Ji Wan Hussin
- Hishamuddin Rais
- Jomo Kwame Sundaram
- Farish A. Noor
- R. Nadeswaran
- Martin Vengadesan

== Literature ==
- Chin, James (2003). MalaysiaKini.com and its Impact on Journalism and Politics in Malaysia. In K.C. Ho, Randy Kluver, & C.C. Yang (Eds.), Asia.com: Asia Encounters the Internet, pp. 129–142. London: RoutledgeCurzon. ISBN 0-415-31503-4.
- Steele, Janet (2023). MalaysiaKini and the Power of Independent Media in Malaysia. (NUS Press), ISBN 978-981-325-240-0.
