= Hishamuddin Rais =

Malaysian film director, stand-up comedian, political and social activist

Hishamuddin Rais (also known under the pen-name of Isha Raism) is a Malaysian film director, stand-up comedian, political and social activist. He is also notable as a columnist for several newspapers including Berita Minggu, The Sun, Malaysiakini.com and Off The Edge.

== Education ==
Hishamuddin completed his secondary education at the Malay College Kuala Kangsar. He obtained his degree in South East Asia History in 1971 from University of Malaya. He is also a film and video graduate from the University of Westminster, London.

He is fluent in the French language.

== Bibliography ==
- Pilihanraya atau Pilihan Jalanraya (English: General Election or Highway Selection) (2002).
- Keganasan, Penipuan & Internet (English: Violence, Lies & Internet) (2008)
- Tapai: Travel and Guilty Pleasures of a Fermented Malaysian (2010)
- Tertangkapnya Sa-ekor Toyo: Surat dari Teoh Beng Hock (2011)
- Tipu Pilihan Raya, Turun Jalan Raya (2013)
- Surah-Surah Terlarang: Persoalan Nasional (2019)
- Merakam Sejarah: Turun Jalan Raya Menang Pilihan Raya (2021)
- Malapetaka Iklim: Memahami Fenomena Pemanasan Dunia (2023)

== Filmography ==
Hishamuddin has produced and directed several films, namely:

=== Short films ===
- From here to a long yesterday
- Malaysia werewolf in london
- Three second of see

=== Feature films ===
Year	Title	Notes
1998	Dari Jemapoh ke Manchester	as writer and director
2014	Men Who Save the World	as actor, playing the Tok Bomoh

== Stand-up comedy ==
Hishamuddin is also a notable stand-up comedian, having performed several shows in Malaysia and in foreign countries, most recently in the United Kingdom.

== Politics ==
Hishamuddin was actively involved in campus politics while he was still studying at the University of Malaya. His subsequent entry into Malaysian politics came after he returned to Malaysia in 1994 after having graduated in film and video from the University of Westminster, London in 1992. He organised several street demonstrations from 1998 to 2000 following the ouster of the Deputy Prime Minister of Malaysia, Anwar Ibrahim.

=== ISA detention ===
In 2001, Hishamuddin was arrested under the section 71(3) of the Internal Security Act 1984 on the charge of conspiracy to overthrow the government with threats and violence.

=== Sedition charge ===
In 2013, together with Tian Chua and Adam Adli Abdul Halim, Hishammuddin was charged with sedition for their speeches at Kuala Lumpur and Selangor Chinese Assembly Hall on 13 May.
