= R. Nadeswaran =

Malaysian investigative journalist

Nadeswaran a/l Rajah (born April 21, 1952) is an investigative journalist and author from Malaysia. Better known as Citizen Nades, he has penned three best-selling true crime books and made his name in the Malaysian media where he has been a published writer and editor from the late 1960s until 2026.

He also gained fame in 1977 when he saved the life of an infant while he was covering an airplane disaster.

== Life and career ==
He was born in Klang in 1952 to an estate conductor and a homemaker who were originally from Jaffna, Sri Lanka. One of four children, he attended the Simpang Lima English Primary School and Klang High School. He began writing letters to the Malay Mail and was published in the late 1960s before eventually getting a job as a sports stringer there. In a varied career he worked for The Malay Mail, New Straits Times, The Star, The Leader and The Sun, while in retirement he wrote columns for news portal Malaysiakini.

On September 27,1977 a Douglas DC-8 airliner Japan Air Lines Flight 715 crashed in Elmina Estate, Sungai Buloh. Nadeswaran volunteered to cover the plane crash and when he arrived on the scene he discovered a three-year-old named Maria Jean Burkhart who had lost her father in the crash.

He rescued the child and helped reunite her with her mother Salimah Nordin. Some 46 years after the crash, Nadeswaran met the baby he had helped. He eventually moved from sports to writing exposes about corrupt practices and the abuse of power within local councils, state governments and the business community in Malaysia.

As a defender of press freedom, he often reminded readers about the draconian actions of the Mahathir Mohamad government during Ops Lalang, when The Star newspaper was shut down and many opposition and civil society figures were detained without trial.

He briefly returned to his studies in 1995 and obtained a law degree from the Anglia Ruskin University. However, he found himself more suited to journalism and went on to head The Sun's investigative desk for more than a decade.

While at The Sun, he helped uncover the story of the house of the late Port Klang assemblyman Datuk Zakaria Deros and the Port Klang Free Zone (PKFZ) scandal. He also wrote about the billboard licensing scandal involving Petaling Jaya's local authorities, the proposal for a High Performance Training Centre in London for Malaysian athletes, public land grabs in Bandar Utama and Ampang Jaya. He also revealed that MCA vice-president Ng Yen Yen had obtained permanent residence (PR) in Australia and exposed the disappearance of funds of the association of wives of state assemblymen and members of parliament in Selangor.

The father of two daughters, Nadeswaran experienced personal tragedy when his younger child Sumitra died at the age of 19 in an early morning car accident.

In 2012, Nadeswaran was ordered by the Kuala Lumpur High Court to pay RM300,000 in damages to businessman Mohamad Salim Fateh Din for defamation over two tweets he had posted on July 12, 2010, and December 22, 2010. In the tweets he had questioned Mohamad Salim's heritage and the propriety of some of his land deals.

In February 2015, he was appointed to the MACC's Consultative and Anti-Corruption Panel, while in 2018, after the fall of the Barisan Nasional government led by Najib Abdul Razak, Nadeswaran was appointed to the HRDF Governance Oversight Committee to probe mismanagement and ensure transparency in the use of funds. He was also vocal in his objections to the contract extensions given to MACC chief Azam Baki.

In 2025 he was featured in the MPI's #wartawanintegritiberetika campaign in 2025, which emphasizes ethical journalism.

== Books ==
Nadeswaran published three books, namely:

- PKFZ: Some Untold Stories (2009),
- Curi Curi Malaysia (2016) and
- Scandals & Scoundrels: A collection of essays on 1MDB & related issues (2022).
