= Wong Chin Huat =

Malaysian political activist

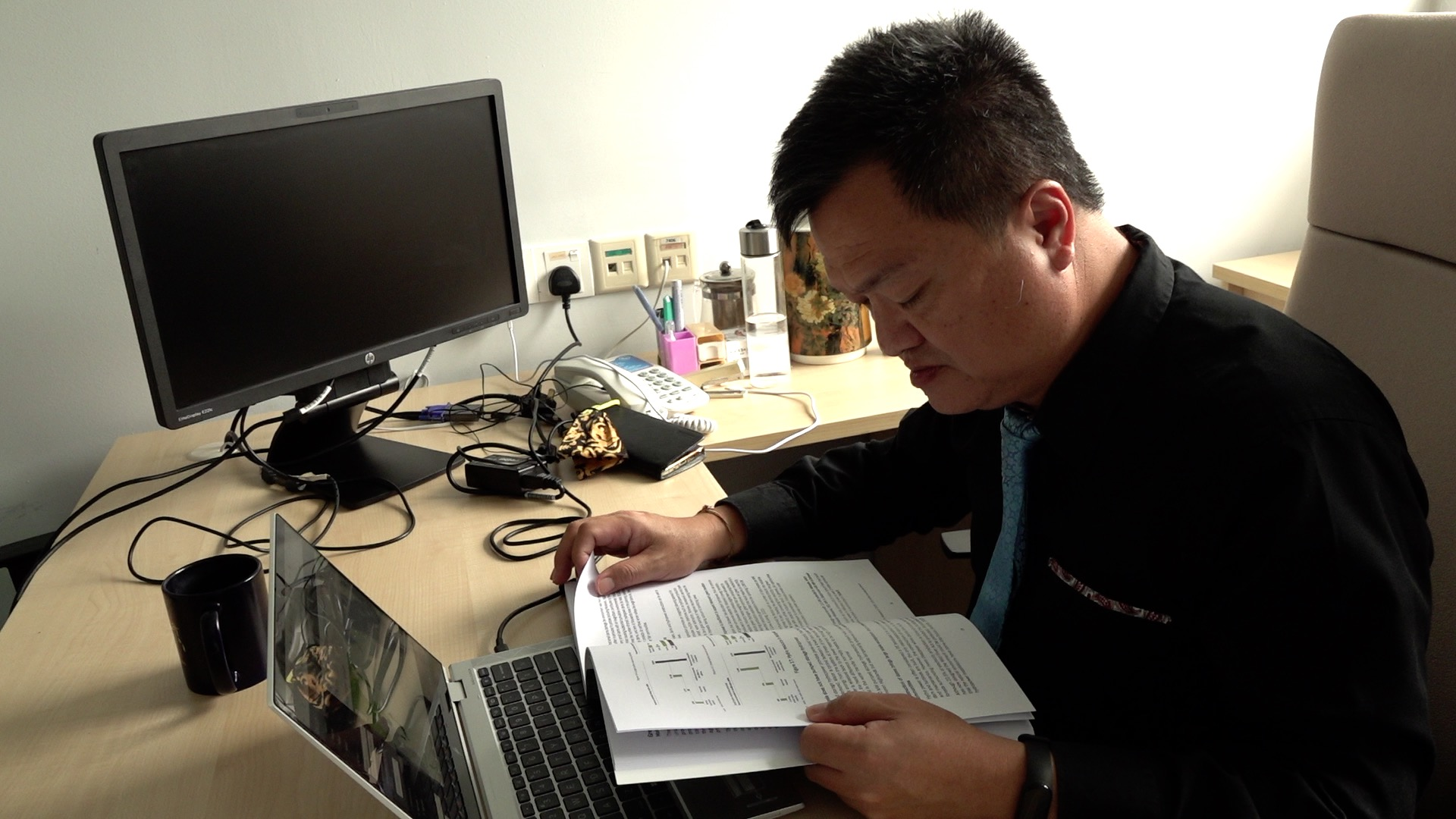
Wong Chin Huat in 2022

Wong Chin Huat is a Malaysian political scientist, scholar, analyst, activist, commentator, columnist, observer and lecturer.

== Education ==
A fellow at Penang Institute, a think tank linked to the Penang State Government, he earned his PhD from University of Essex, UK on a thesis on electoral system and party politics in West Malaysia between 1982 and 2004 at the University of Essex. He was a Chevening scholar. He obtained a Bachelor of Economics degree from University of Malaya in 1996 and a MA degree in Industrial and Organisational Psychology from Universiti Kebangsaan Malaysia (UKM) in 2000. Before joining Penang Institute, he taught journalism at Monash University Sunway Campus for six years.

== Activism ==
He has been an activist for various causes from media freedom, electoral reform, freedom of assembly to environmental protection. His favorite quote is "Churchill was right" from the former Britain Prime Minister, Sir Winston Leonard Spencer-Churchill. He is most known for his role as a leader in the electoral reform movement, Coalition for Clean and Fair Elections (Bersih) and later the Coalition for Clean and Fair Elections 2.0 (Bersih 2.0), in which he was arrested three times for the cause. Beginning 2011, he has also assisted in green movements in Kuantan, Raub and Pengerang. In late 2011, he helped form a new NGO called "KillTheBill" which organised a series of creative protests during weekends for two months to oppose the restrictive Peace Assembly Bill. Earlier in 2001, he played a key role in organising a boycott campaign of writers against the takeover of Nanyang Press by the Malaysian Chinese Association, one of the ruling parties of the Malaysian government, orchestrated by Nanyang's rival Sin Chew Group. The group of writers eventually formed the Writer Alliance for Media Independence (WAMI) and Wong took over the chairmanship in 2006. His first NGO work was as the Executive Secretary of the Malaysian Chinese Organisation Election Appeal Committee, a lobby which advocated for broad institutional and policy reform and soon earned the wrath of the Government.

Having cut his teeth as political commentators at Nanyang Siang Pao and later also Sin Chew Daily during the Reformasi years, Wong is today known as a columnist for various internet and community media, The Nut Graph, FZ.com, The Edge, Selangor Times, Asia Times (www.atimes.com), the Chinese edition of Malaysiakini, and the defunct merdekareview.com.

== Issues ==
He has written and spoken on multiple national issues. Among of them are local election, federalism, press freedom and voting system.

=== Suqiu ===
Prior to his pursuit of PhD in UK, he worked for a Chinese-community reformist group Suqiu (The Malaysian Chinese Organization Election Appeals Committee) as its executive secretary from May 2000 to March 2001. Suqiu was attacked by the then Prime Minister Dr Mahathir Mohamad as a threat to national security comparable to communist insurgents and religious fanatics in his 2000 National Day address. In that capacity, Wong was one of the civil society pioneers in lobbying parliamentarians.

=== Press activism ===
Wong cut his teeth as a political columnist and freelance writer for Nanyang Siang Pao from 1998 to 2001. Together with over 90 other writers, Wong quit writing for all the four major Chinese-language national dailies in May 2001 when the Malaysian Chinese Association (MCA) forcibly took over the Nanyang Press (controlling Nanyang Siang Pao and China Press) with the tacit help of Sin Chew Media group (controlling Sin Chew Daily and Guang Ming Daily). The group later formed the Writer Alliance for Media Independence (WAMI), which Wong became its chairperson since 2006.

Due to his opposition to the monopoly, with Sin Chew boss Tiong Hew King now controlling all the four major Chinese-language national dailies, Wong and his colleagues like Tang Ah Chai are constantly blacked out by these dailies especially Sin Chew Daily. Wong's news reappears in Tiong's newspapers after his arrest in 2009.

On the eve of the 1999 general elections, Wong and a few other writers like Teoh Kian Hoon, Fong Wai Foong, Teh Hoon Seng, Lee Wing Keat and the late Ng Boon Jieh launched a trilingual declaration of citizen awareness titled "People are the Boss", using simple business language to explain the concept of democracy. Formulated to counter Dr Mahathir's argument that people should be thankful to the government, the concept is now widely used ten years later, even by Barisan Nasional leaders.

== Arrest under Sedition Act and subsequent protests ==
The Bersih movement launched 1BlackMalaysia campaign on 5 May 2009 as an act of civil disobedience in protesting to what it called as an "ongoing Perak coup" by Barisan Nasional. Wong was one of the representatives present at the launch of the campaign.

In the evening of the same day, Wong was arrested by the police for sedition under Section 4 (1) of the Sedition Act 1948 for several articles. He was eventually remanded for 4 days before release.

His arrest prompted protests in Kuala Lumpur, Penang and Kuching. Further arrests were made by the police for assembling illegally. The further arrests later created a controversy where the police arrested several legal counsels who were trying to defend the detainees. Approximately 200 lawyers gathered and protested against the arrests of legal counsels in the next day.

No charge however was filed and all were released in matter of days.

== Mugging at Petaling Jaya ==
While jogging in the morning of 9 June 2012, Wong Chin Huat was allegedly attacked by 5 young men riding motorbikes. The attack left Wong Chin Huat with injuries to the face. When asked to comment on the incident, Wong blamed the Malaysian police for not protecting him. The Bersih leader was examined at Universiti of Malaya Medical Centre.
