= Sikhism in Malaysia =

Indian origin ethnic group

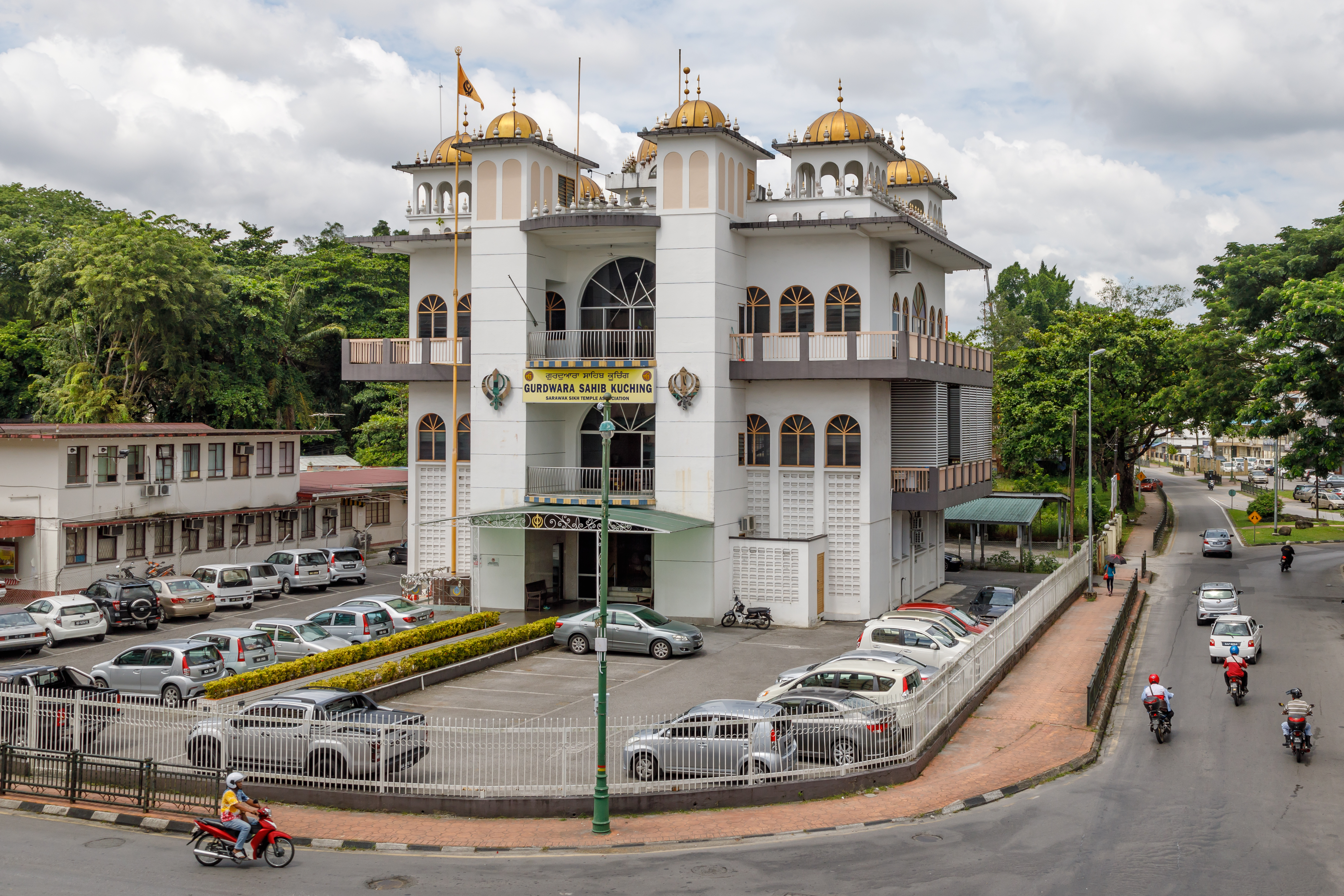
- Gurdwara in Kuching, Sarawak, Malaysia

Total population
- ~100,000 – 130,000; 0.3% of the total Malaysian population

Regions with significant populations
- Perak

Religions
- Sikhism

Languages
- Punjabi · English · Malay

Malaysian Sikhs are known to be the fourth largest Malaysian Indian ethnic group. It is estimated that there are around 100,000 to 130,000 Sikhs in Malaysia.

== History ==
=== British Malaya ===
==== Sikh migration to and settlement in the colonies ====
Sikhs were initially sent to British Malaya as political prisoners. The first few Sikhs to arrive in British Malaya were Nihal Singh (better known as Bhai Maharaj Singh) and Khurruck Singh, who were deported from India due to anti-British involvement in 1849. These prisoners were sent to the Outram Road prison in what is now Singapore. In 1865, Sikhs were sent to Malaysia again as recruits in the armed forces in the British Empire mainly as police, military and guards. Before the British penal colony in the Singapore Straits Settlement closed in 1873, Sikh convicts discharged from it may have settled in Malaya in the years prior to its closing.

In 1873, the British brought Sikh soldiers to Malaya to guard the Perak tin mines from the Chinese. The early Sikh migrants to Malaya came from different cultural regions of the Punjab, with roughly 20% being from Doaba (situated between the Beas and Sutlej rivers), 35% from Malwa (located south and east of the Sutlej river), and 35% from Majha (area between the Ravi and Beas rivers), with the remainder being from other regions.The Malwai and Majhai Sikh dominance amongst the early Sikh migrants to Malaya (in contrast to the histories of other Sikh diasporas, where Doabis tended to be overrepresented among early Sikh pioneers) is a reflection of British preference of Sikh recruits from these regions in its security forces. In the period of early Sikh migration to Malaya, there was a considerable amount of return-migration of returnees to Punjab, with as high as 80% of early Sikh migrants in Malaya returning home at certain points.

The first-choice destination for prospective Sikh immigrants in India were Canada, the United States, Australia, and New Zealand. However, when these countries started restricting the migration of South Asians coming in, then many Sikhs settled for their second-choice, which was Malaya and Fiji.

During the 1920's, inward Sikh migration to Malaya was dominated by Jat Sikhs whom after arriving from India sought employment in the government or quasi-government security forces. However, if they could not successfully land a security force job, then they often settled for work as caretakers, watchmen, bullock-cart drivers, dairy-keepers, and labourers at the mines.

After the first initial wave of Sikhs migrants seeking employment, the Sikh population of Malaya leveled-off at around 10,000 Sikhs. This population was dominated by single men with few families amongst them.

Between 1930 and 1953, Sikh migrants arriving in Malaya are described as "commercial migrants". A large influx into Malaya by these Sikh commercial migrants occurred after the partition of Punjab and also due to concerns that there may be a ban on immigration into Malaya pending. Before the end of World War II, the vast majority of Sikhs migrating to Malaya were single men, with few bringing their families with them. After 1945, more Sikh families from back home in India were able to join the Sikh men in Malaya.

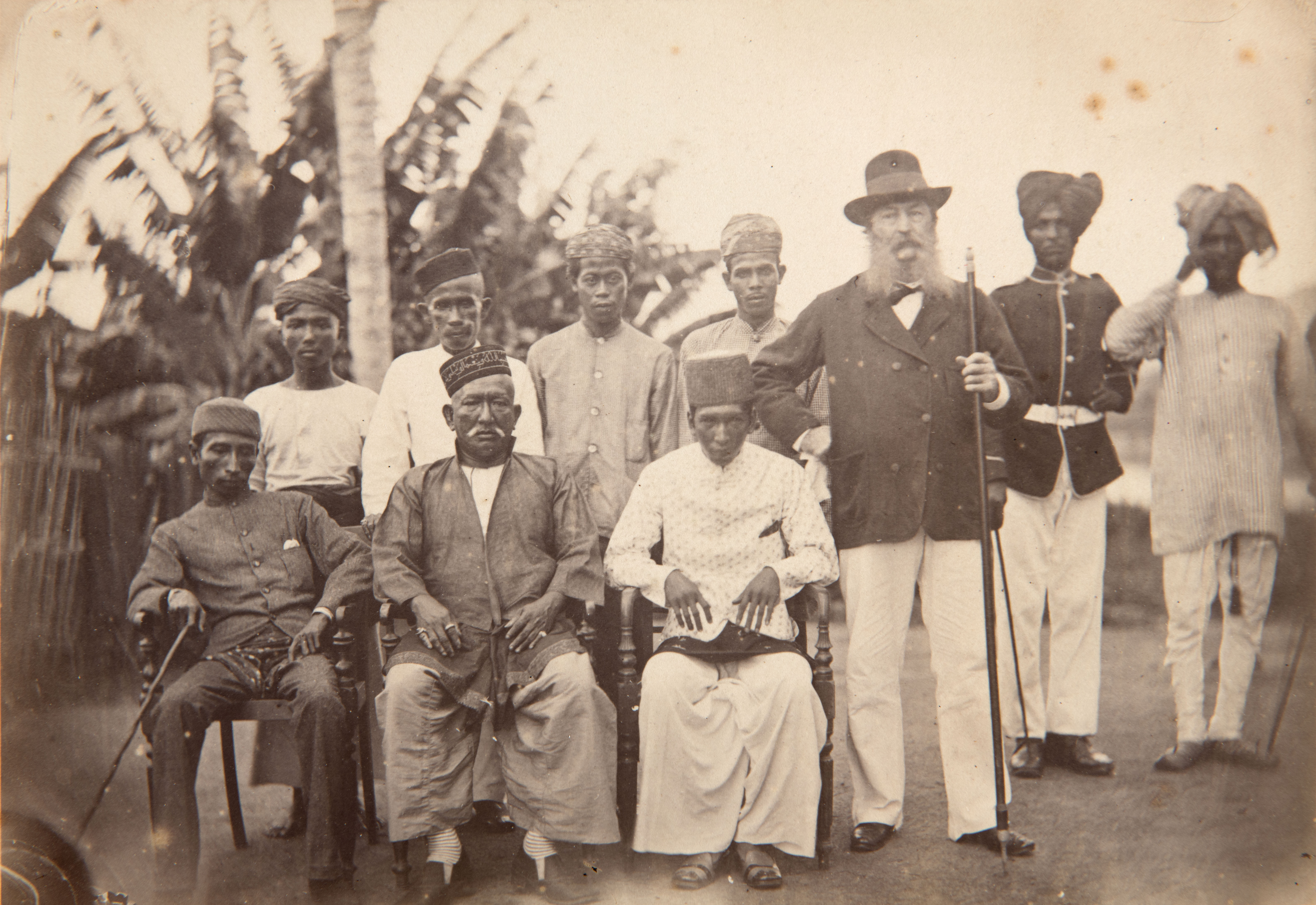
Group portrait with Hugh Low, the British resident of Perak, and two Malaysian rajas, local administrators in Perak and Larut, ca.1880–81. Sikhs can be visible.

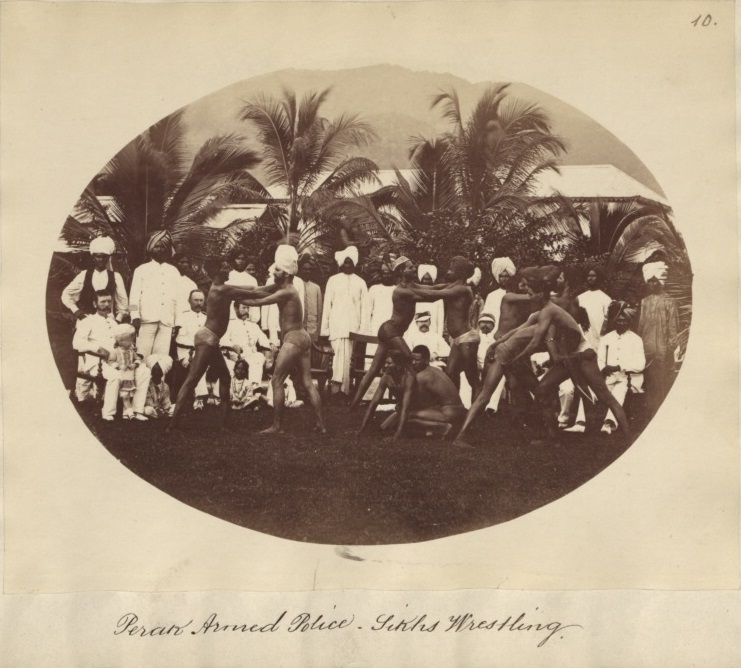
Sikhs from the Perak Armed Police wrestling in Perak, Malaya, ca.1880–1890

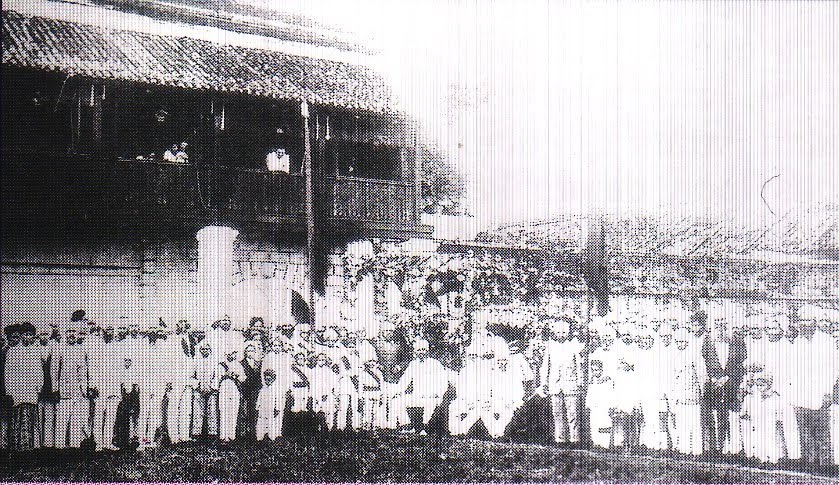
Photograph of Gurdwara Sahib Sikh Police, Fort Cornwallis, Penang, Malaysia, taken on 28 December 1927

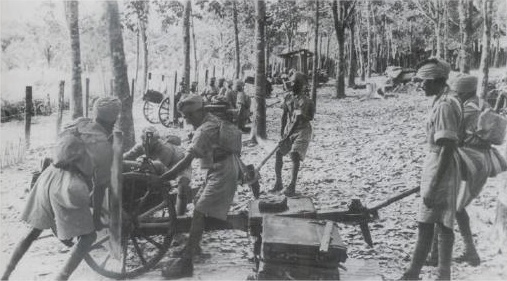
Sikh soldiers of the Indian Infantry Division during World War II involved in a fierce battle with the Imperial Japanese Army in the Battle of Kampar, British Malaya (1941)

==== Establishment of Sikh temples and organizations ====
In Malaya, the Sikh community followed this pattern when it came to setting-up its organizations:

1. First, visiting preachers would be brought in.
2. Second, a committee would be established.
3. Third, plans would be made for fund-raising.
4. Fourth, gurdwaras would be established.

The first Sikh Gurdwara was set up in Cornwallis in 1873 inside police lines. The first public Sikh Gurdwara was set up in 1903 in Penang.

In 1895, a Sikh from Hong Kong named Lal Singh visited Penang and helped start-up a Singh Sabha organization there. The Penang Singh Sabha was established on 19 May 1895. The first meetings at the Penang Singh Sabha involved readings of the Khalsa Samachar publication. The officers elected for the Penang Singh Sabha most consisted of higher ranking soldiers, such as subahdar majors. The Penang Singh Sabha hastily undertook efforts to baptize Sikhs through the Amrit Sanchar ceremony. Also, it recuperated Sikhs that had "strayed from gurbani" through a straightforward shuddhi ceremony.

By the 1890's, there were three Singh Sabhas established on the Malay Peninsula. These three Singh Sabhas were based in Singapore, Penang, and Taiping, respectively. These three Singh Sabhas eventually coalesced to form the Khalsa Diwan of Malaya, established on 27 December 1903, the morning after Guru Gobind Singh's birthday celebration. (Note: The Khalsa Diwan of Malaya was originally named 'Khalsa Diwan Muluk Malaya' when it was established in 1903. It later acquired the name 'Khalsa Diwan Malaya' (abbreviated as K.D.M.)) The Khalsa Diwan of Malaya's creation was announced at the Malay State Guides Gurdwara in Taiping after a unanimous desire for the creation of a formal registered Sikh society in Malaya to take care of the religious, cultural, educational and other needs of the local Sikh community. The Khalsa Diwan of Malaya would coordinate fundraising for the benefit of the Sikh community and organized occasional diwans which were attended by hundreds of Sikhs.

The inaugural committee of the Khalsa Diwan of Malaya comprised 26 Sikhs, with the most noteworthy roles being given to the following persons:

1903 inaugural committee of the Khalsa Diwan of Malaya (Note: This table only displays the most prominent committee positions. Aside from the below, there were 20 other Sikhs as committee members from Taiping, Penang, Kedah, Batu Gajah, Ipoh, Kuala Kangsar, Kuala Lumpur, and Kampar.)
Role	Name	Rank or title	Place of origin
President	Gurdit Singh	Subedar Major	Taiping
Vice-president	Sunder Singh	Doctor	Penang
Vice-president	Bahaal Singh	Jemadar	Kulim
Secretary	Thakar Singh	Subedar	Taiping
Assistant secretary	Moola Singh	Bhai	Ipoh
Treasurer	Khajaan Singh	Munshi	Taiping

Taiping-based Sikhs established the Sri Guru Singh Sabha Taiping (S.G.S.S. Taiping) on 15 September 1916 to cater the local Sikh community. The management committee of the S.G.S.S. Taiping requested land for their organization so they could erect a structure. On 18 January 1918, land from Upper Station Road (currently known as Jalan Stesen Hulu) was given to the Sikhs to build their gurdwara on. A British man who resided in Perak named Sir William George Maxwell helped gather donations for the new gurdwara. The corner stone of the new gurdwara was laid on 26 November 1920. The gurdwara was opened in 1921 and the Khalsa School Taiping (Sikh religious school) was established on 1 January 1928 at its premises.

In the 1920's, Gurdwara Sahib Taiping was established by the Sri Guru Singh Sabha Taiping. Prior to the establishment of Gurdwara Sahib Taiping, the local Sikh community's temple was located at the Malay State Guides premises in Taiping.

==== Sikh occupations in British Malaya ====
===== Policemen and soldiers =====
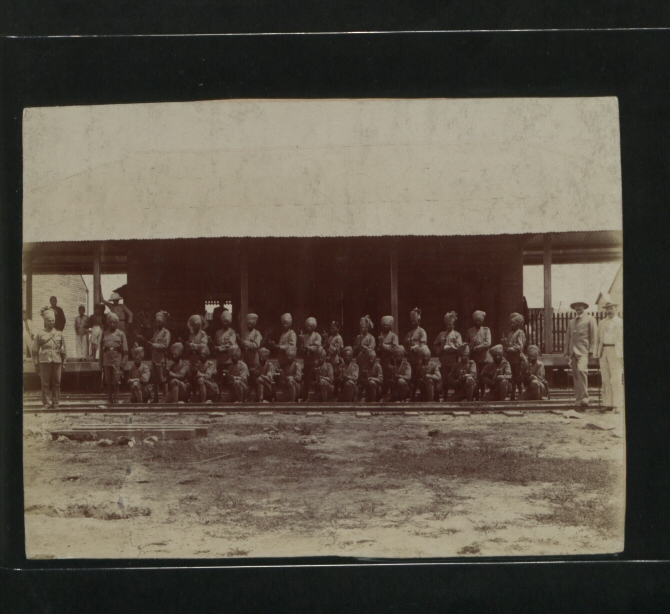
Sikh constabulary in British North Borneo, Jesselton or Sandakan

Beginning in the early 1870's, Sikh policemen and soldiers arrived in Malaya to work across various towns and ports. Sikhs were recruited in 1873 by Captain Tristram Speedy to work as a protective force for a Malay chieftain.

In the early 1880's, a small body of Sikh cavalry troops was established to clamp down on highway robberies, which at the time were a very regular occurrence on the pass between Taiping, Kamunting, and Kinta. The Sikhs were stationed at night and the problem of robberies on the pass soon was resolved. With the eventual construction of the Taiping Kinta cart road, roadways in Kinta, and railways plus the adoption of the telegram, the Sikh troops became less of a need to police the route.

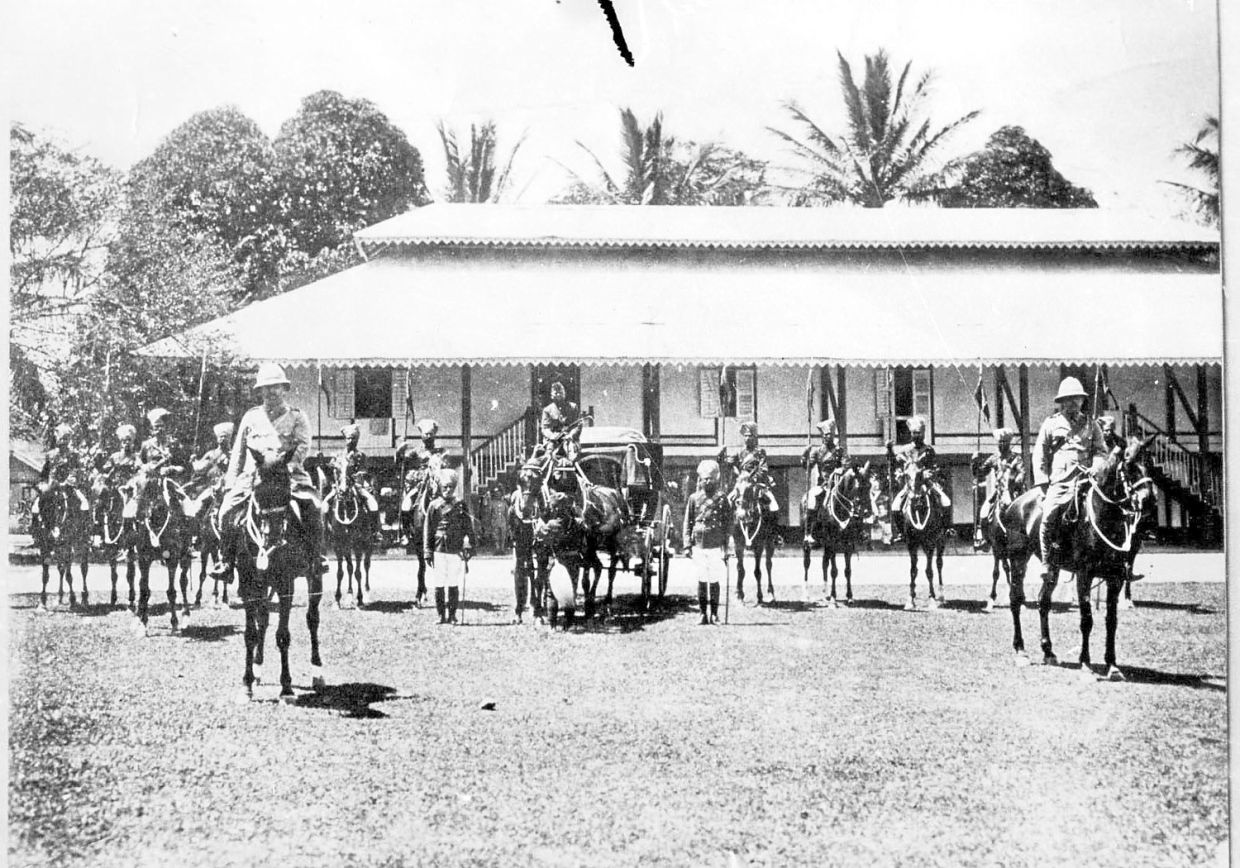
Sikh troopers of the Sultan of Perak in 1915

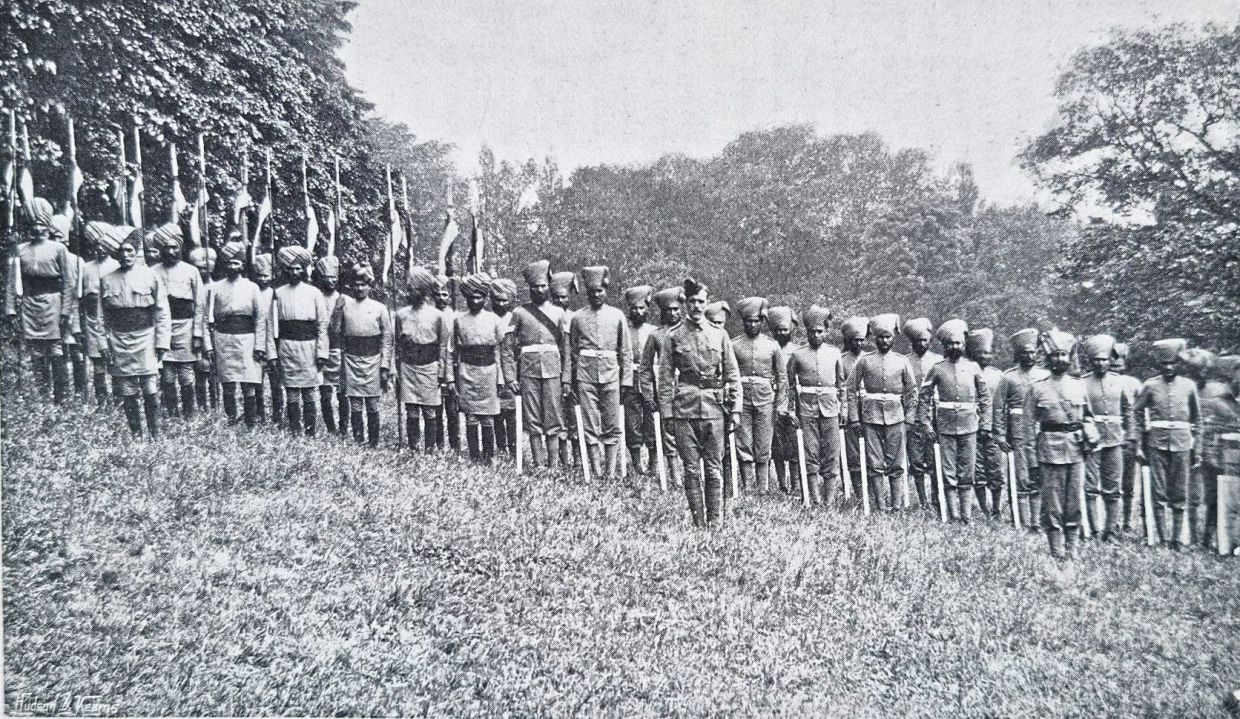
Sikh soldiers from the Perak Lancers (left) and Malay States Guides at Hampton Court Palace, England, during the coronation of King Edward VII in August 1902.

====== Bodyguards of the sultan of Perak ======
After the formation of the Malay States Guides in 1896, the Sikh cavalry troop body was separated and shifted from Taiping to Kuala Kangsar for the purpose of establishing a royal bodyguard of Sikhs for the sultan of Perak, Idris Murshidul Azzam Shah. In 1900, the Sikh bodyguard unit of the Perak sultan consisted of a native officer, two Duffadars, and twelve Sowars (mounted orderlies). (Note: A duffadar is equivalent in rank to a sergeant in the cavalry. Sowars are mounted orderlies.) The Sowards were armed with lances (with red and white pennants), swords, and carbines. They wore scarlet coats which often donned medals. Prior to Perak, many of them had past military service in the Anglo-Burmese wars or the Northwest Frontier. This group of mounted Sikh bodyguards was headquartered near the Bukit Chandan palace. The Sikh bodyguards always were in the retinue of the sultan whenever he travelled his carriage and pair during ceremonial events. Idris Murshidul Azzam Shah was the only sultan in the Federated Malay States who possessed a private Sikh mounted personal guard. The Sikh bodyguards of the sultan also provided escort at parades in Singapore. Rather than being purely ceremonial in nature, the Sikh bodyguards of the sultan were often tasked with patrolling the mining localities of the Kinta district during periods of trouble. In 1902, the sultan, along with his Sikh detail, travelled to England for the coronation ceremony of King Edward VII, embarking from Penang aboard the P&O; steamer Ceylon and arriving 30 May 1902 at the Royal Albert Docks. Besides the Sikh detail of the sultan, Sikhs from the Malay States Police and Malay States Guides also attended the coronation ceremony and were quartered at Alexandra Palace. By 1913, the bodyguard detail of the sultan of Perak consisted of one Duffadars, one Naik, 13 Sowars, 13 horses, and seven syces. (Note: A Naik is equivalent in rank to a corporal. Syces are people who take care of horses.)

==== Relations with the local inhabitants ====
Sikh men residing in colonial Malaya usually married women from their own community by going back to Punjab to find a wife. However, some Sikhs in Malaya married local Malay women, especially in the area of Sabah and a couple of other Malay states. In Kelantan, which is adjacent to Thailand, many Sikh men married local Siamese women.

=== Independent Malaysia (1957–present) ===
In 1970, the then fifty-year-old building that was Gurdwara Sahib Taiping was demolished to make way for a new, double-story building to house the gurdwara. This new building was opened on 14 April 1971 on Vaisakhi.

==== Current status ====
The Sikh community is the largest here among Southeast and East Asia. There are as many as 13 Sikh Gurdwaras in Kuala Lumpur alone more than the number of mosques there, despite Muslims being the dominant demographic in Kuala Lumpur. Malaysian Sikhs are deep-rooted in Sikh culture more than Sikh diaspora anywhere in the world and are assimilated in mainstream keeping their identity intact.

A group of Sikh businessmen in Malaysia has set up a network of International Sikh Entrepreneurs (NISE) to promote their products and services and generate opportunities among members.

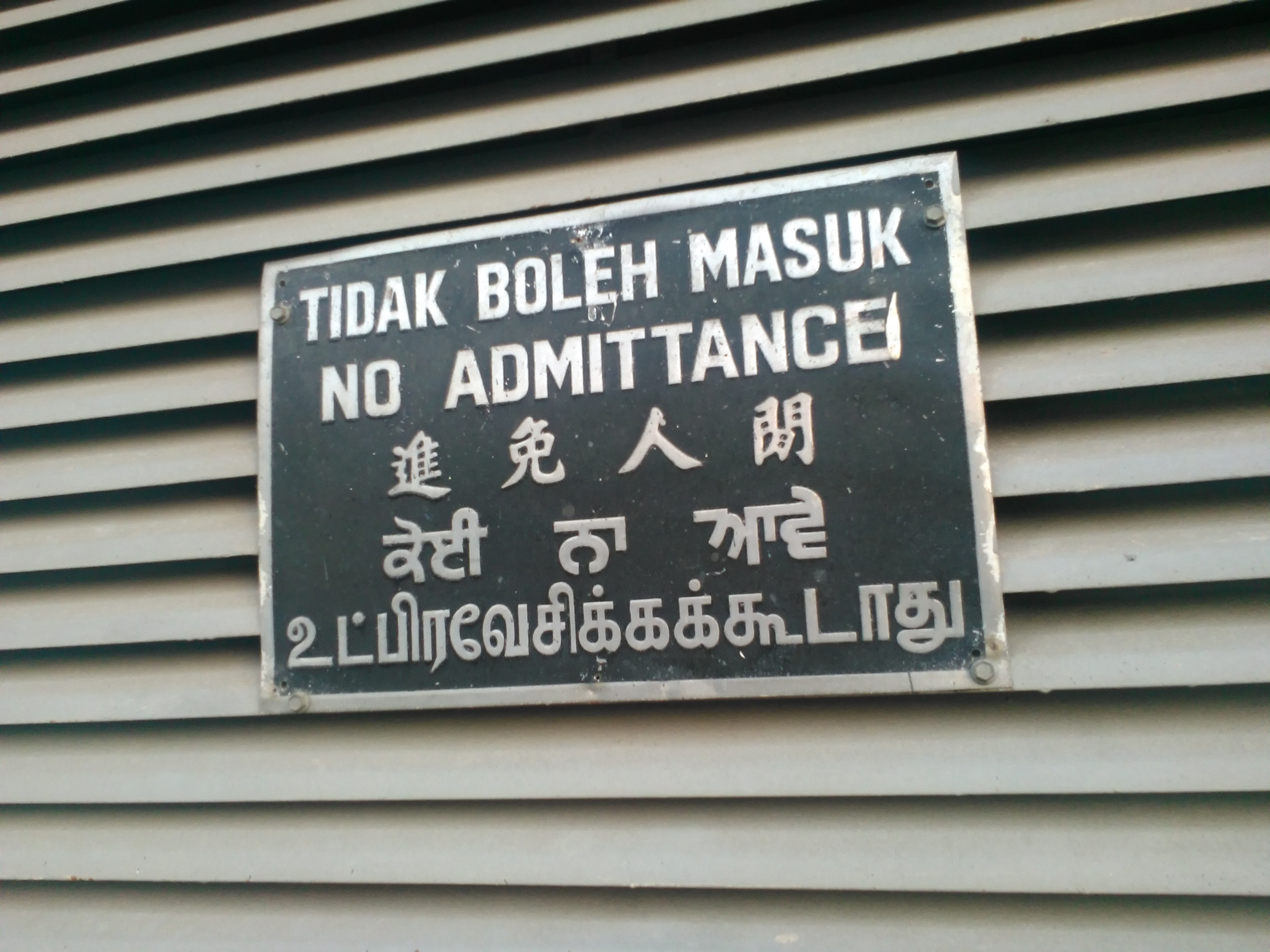
Multilingual no admittance sign in Kuala Lampur exhibiting Punjabi in Gurmukhi script

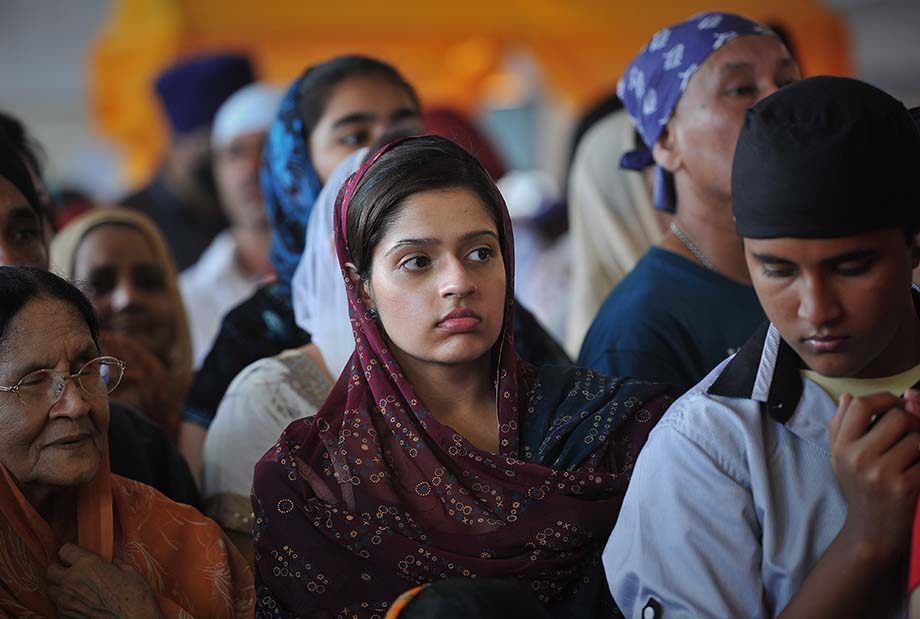
A Sikh women hear speeches from the Prime Minister Najib Razak during a Vaisakhi celebration at Gurdwara Sahib in Kuala Lumpur on April 14th, 2013.

== Festivals ==
A local Malaysian Sikh festival is the Barsi of Sant Sohan Singh, which is observed annually at Gurdwara Sahib Malacca.

== Influence of Sikhs on Malaysian culture ==
=== Khoo Kongsi temple ===
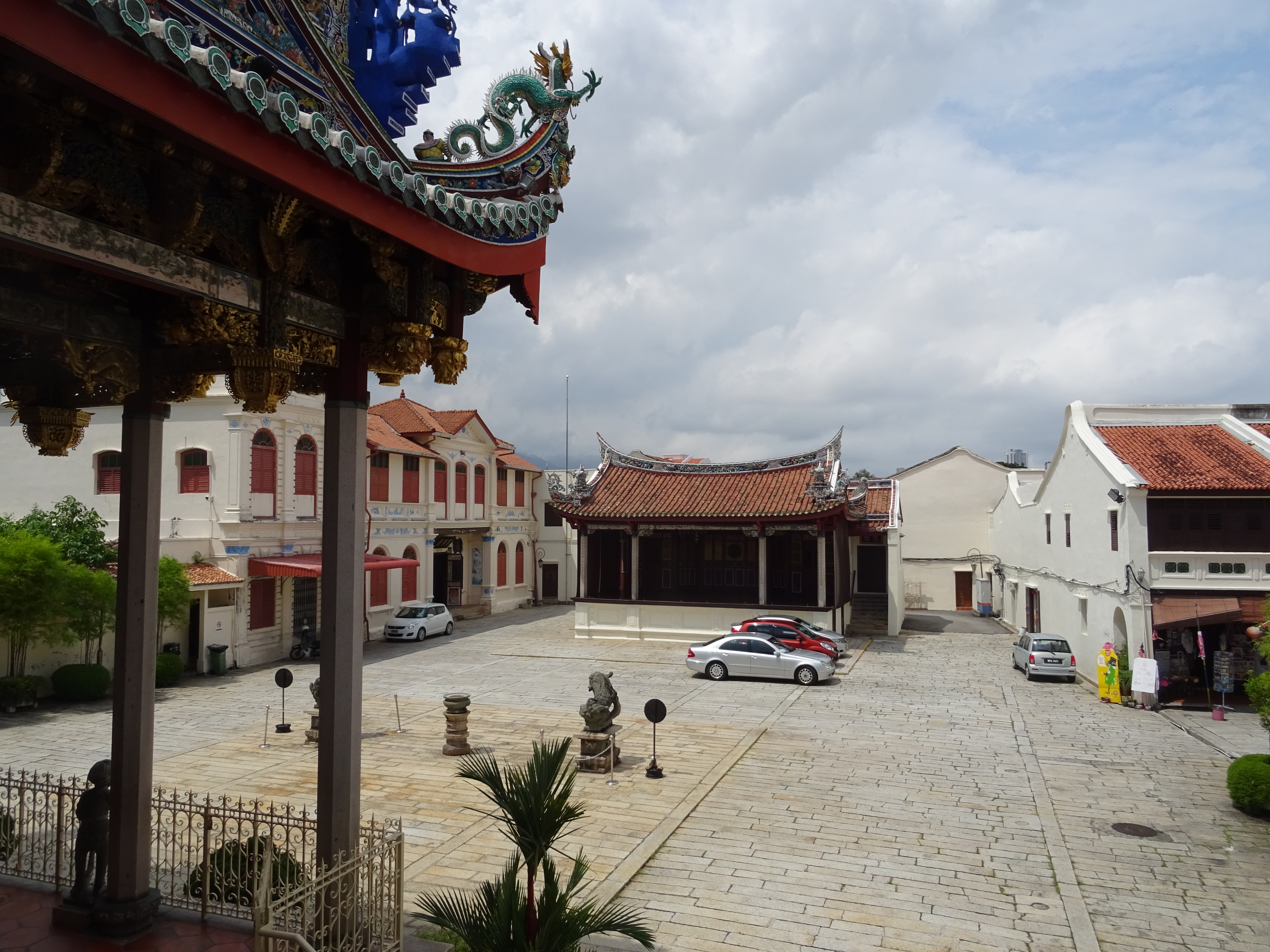
Sikh guardian statue at the Khoo Kongsi temple (bottom-left)

There exists a Sikh guardian statue at the prayer hall of the Khoo Kongsi temple in Penang. The Sikh guardian statue symbolizes protection of the prayer hall.

=== Malaysian-Chinese funeral practices ===
Certain Malaysian-Chinese communities burn paper effigies of Sikh watchmen during funerals due to the belief that it will help ensure the soul of the deceased individual will have a safe journey to the afterworld.

== Controversy ==
In 2016, a teaching module published by a leading Malaysian university (Universiti Teknologi Malaysia, UTM) depicted Hindus in India as unclean and dirty in a slide. Another slide aimed at teaching the origins of Sikhism claimed that founder Guru Nanak had a poor understanding of Islam and had combined it with his surrounding Hindu lifestyle in forming the early foundation of the Sikh faith. A police report was lodged by the chairman of the Hindu Dharma Association of Malaysia in Sungai Petani district against UTM. Malaysia's Minister of Health, Deputy Minister of Education and others had condemned this incident. Due to these condemnations, UTM was forced to apologize.

== Demographics ==
=== Historical population ===
Sikh population of Malaya
Year	Pop.	±%
1921	~8,000	—
1931	~15,000	—
1980	32,685	—
1991	44,815	+37.1%
2000	58,604	+30.8%

== Gurdwaras in Malaysia ==
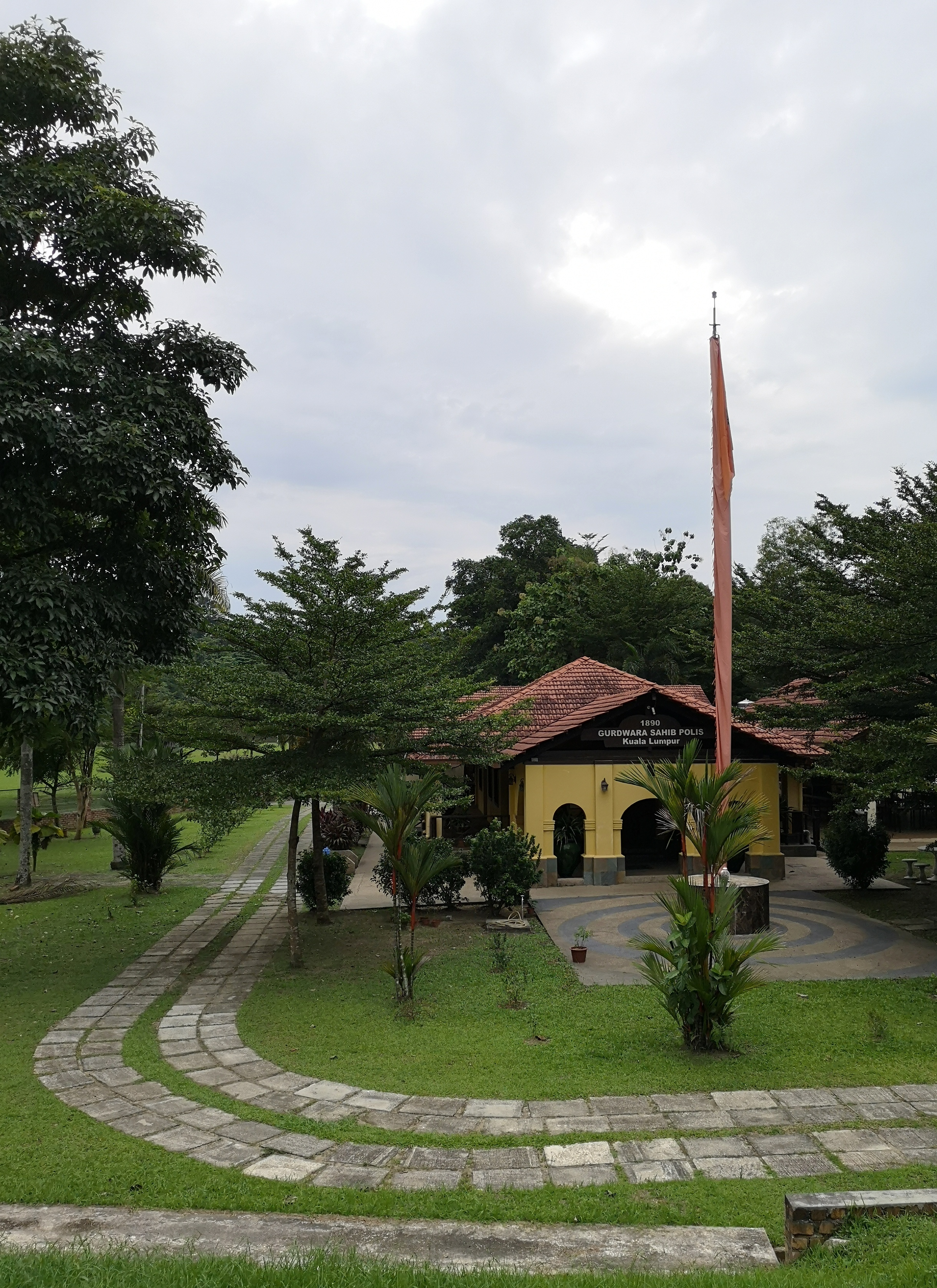
Gurdwara Sahib Polis, Kuala Lampur (est. 1890)

=== Extant gurdwaras ===
There are a total of 119 gurdwaras throughout Malaysia. However, another estimates puts the number of gurdwaras in Malaysia at 130. Many towns have multiple gurdwara even though they share the same congregation. According to Karminder Singh Dhillon, the reason why many gurdwaras exist in close proximity to one another is because when parbhandak (manager) groups are ejected in a gurdwara election, the losing group often establishes a new gurdwara so they can continue being parbhandaks. Therefore, many gurdwaras in Malaysia today arise from rivalries and conflicts within the Sikh community.

41 of them are situated in the state of Perak, where the majority of Sikhs in Malaysia resides.

==== Johor ====
- Gurdwara Sahib Pontian
- Gurdwara Sahib Johor Bahru
- Gurdwara Sahib Kluang
- Gurdwara Sahib Muar
- Gurdwara Sahib Segamat
- Gurdwara Sahib Babe Ke Guru Ram Das
- Gurdwara Sahib Batu Pahat

==== Kuala Lumpur ====
- Gurdwara Sahib Dharamsala
- Gurdwara Sahib Sentul
- Gurdwara Sahib Sikh Temple Shapan
- Sikh Temple Polis Jalan Parlimen
- Sikh Temple Jinjang
- Gurdwara Sahib Kuyow
- Gurdwara Sahib Mainduab
- Gurdwara Sahib Tatt Khalsa Diwan
- Gurdwara Sahib Police High Street
- Sikh Temple Pulapol
- Gurdwara Sahib Titiwangsa
- Wadda Gurdwara Sahib Kampung Pandan
- Gurdwara Sahib Kg Pandan Settlement

==== Labuan ====
- Gurdwara Sahib Labuan

==== Kedah ====
- Gurdwara Sahib Kulim
- Gurdwara Sahib Sungai Petani
- Gurdwara Sahib Alor Setar

==== Kelantan ====
- Gurdwara Sahib Tumpat
- Gurdwara Sahib Kota Bahru
- Gurdwara Sahib Kuala Krai

==== Melaka ====
- Gurdwara Sahib Melaka

==== Negeri Sembilan ====
- Gurdwara Sahib Mantin
- Gurdwara Sahib Jelebu
- Gurdwara Sahib Port Dickson
- Gurdwara Sahib Seremban
- Gurdwara Sahib Kuala Pilah
- Gurdwara Sahib Tampin
- Gurdwara Sahib Sri Sendayan

==== Pahang ====
- Gurdwara Sahib Brinchang
- Gurdwara Sahib Bentong
- Gurdwara Sahib Kuala Lipis
- Gurdwara Sahib Tanah Rata
- Gurdwara Sahib Raub
- Gurdwara Sahib Mentakab
- Gurdwara Sahib Kuantan

==== Penang ====
- Gurdwara Sahib Khalsa Dharmak Jatha
- Gurdwara Sahib Police Penang
- Wadda Gurdwara Sahib Penang
- Gurdwara Sahib Perai
- Gurdwara Sahib Butterworth
- Gurdwara Sahib Bayan Baru

==== Perak ====
- Gurdwara Sahib Ayer Papan
- Gurdwara Sahib Bagan Serai
- Gurdwara Sahib Batu Gajah
- Gurdwara Sahib Bercham
- Gurdwara Sahib Bidor
- Gurdwara Sahib Slim River
- Gurdwara Sahib Buntong
- Gurdwara Sahib Chemor
- Gurdwara Sahib Changkat Batu Gajah
- Gurdwara Sahib Changkat Tin
- Gurdwara Sahib Gopeng
- Gurdwara Sahib Greentown
- Gurdwara Sahib Gunong Rapat
- Gurdwara Sahib Jelapang
- Gurdwara Sahib Kampar
- Gurdwara Sahib Malim Nawar
- Gurdwara Sahib Kuala Kangsar
- Gurdwara Sahib Lahat
- Gurdwara Sahib Menglembu Adh Bazaar
- Gurdwara Sahib Menglembu Settlement
- Gurdwara Sahib Parit Buntar
- Gurdwara Sahib Sikh Dharmik Sabha
- Gurdwara Sahib Pokok Assam
- Gurdwara Shaheed Ganj Sahib
- Gurdwara Sahib Polis Ipoh
- Gurdwara Sahib Kampung Kepayang
- Gurdwara Sahib Pusing
- Gurdwara Sahib Railway
- Gurdwara Sahib Siputeh
- Gurdwara Sahib Sitiawan
- Gurdwara Sahib Sungai Siput
- Gurdwara Sahib Taiping
- Gurdwara Sahib Tambun
- Gurdwara Sahib Tanjong Malim
- Gurdwara Sahib Tanjong Rambutan
- Gurdwara Sahib Tanjong Tualang
- Gurdwara Sahib Tapah
- Gurdwara Sahib Teluk Intan
- Gurdwara Sahib Tronoh
- Gurdwara Sahib Tronoh Mines
- Wadda Gurdwara Sahib Ipoh

==== Perlis ====
- Gurdwara Sahib Kangar

==== Sabah ====
- Gurdwara Sahib Singh Sabha Lahad Datu
- Gurdwara Sahib Tawau
- Gurdwara Sahib Kota Kinabalu
- Gurdwara Sahib Sandakan

==== Sarawak ====
- Gurdwara Sahib Kuching
- Gurdwara Sahib Sibu
- Gurdwara Sahib Bau (closed in 1950s)
- Gurdwara Sahib Miri

==== Putrajaya ====
- Gurdwara Sahib Putrajaya

==== Selangor ====
- Gurdwara Sahib Ampang
- Gurdwara Sahib Khalsa Land
- Gurdwara Sahib Berjuntai Tin
- Gurdwara Sahib Bukit Beruntung
- Gurdwara Sahib Guru Ram Das
- Gurdwara Sahib Kajang
- Gurdwara Sahib Kalumpang
- Gurdwara Sahib Klang
- Gurdwara Sahib Kuala Kubu Baru
- Gurdwara Sahib Lembah Jaya
- Gurdwara Sahib Petaling Jaya
- Gurdwara Sahib Petaling Tin (closed on 1st March 2026)
- Gurdwara Sahib Port Klang
- Gurdwara Sahib Puchong
- Gurdwara Sahib Rasa
- Gurdwara Sahib Rawang
- Gurdwara Sahib Selayang Baru
- Gurdwara Sahib Serdang
- Gurdwara Sahib Serendah
- Gurdwara Sahib Shah Alam
- Gurdwara Sahib Ulu Yam
- Gurdwara Sahib Bandar Sunway
- Gurdwara Sahib Putra Heights
- Gurdwara Sahib Subang
- Gurdwara Sahib Setia City
- Darbar Sri Guru Granth Sahib Ji
- Niketan HQ
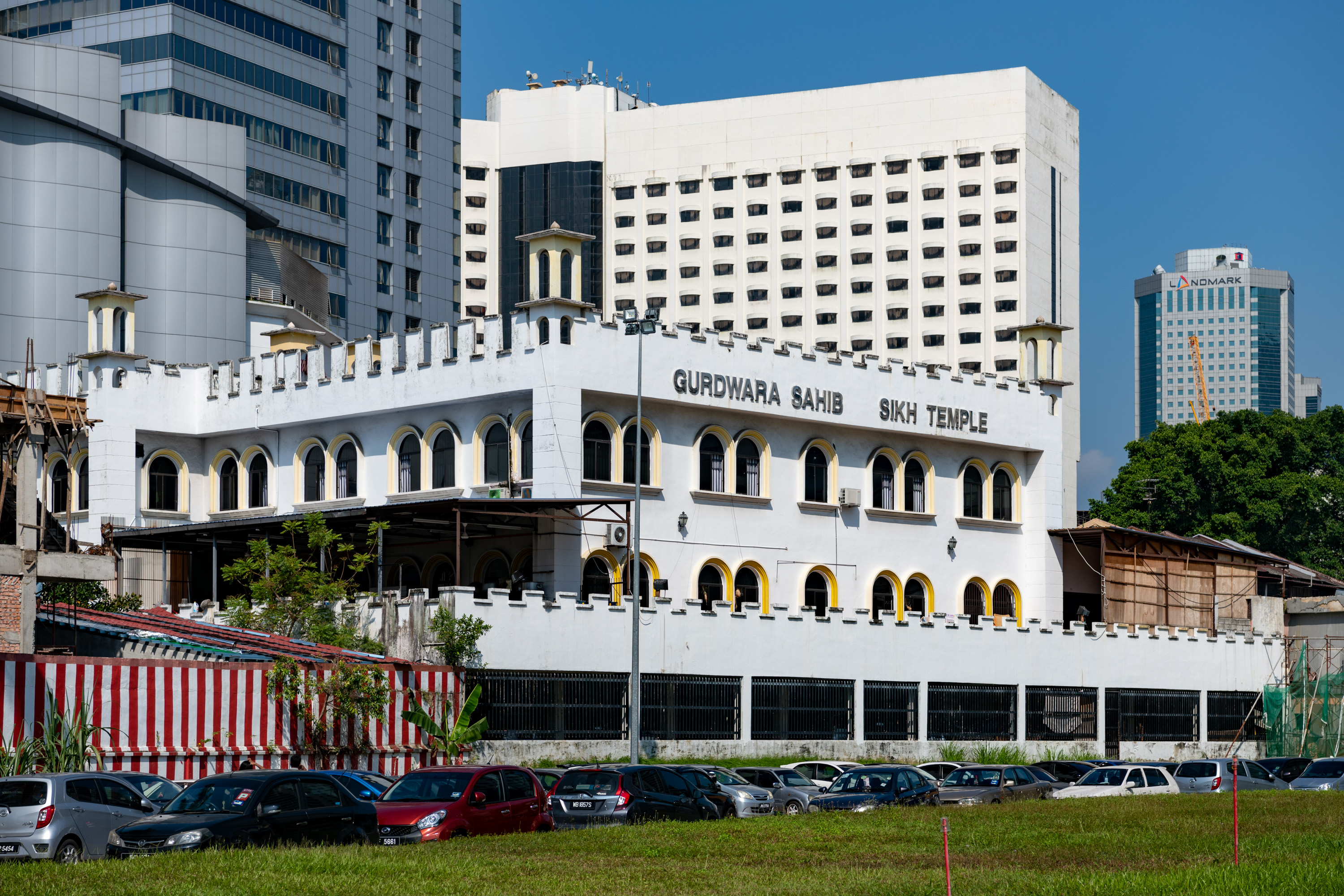
Gurdwara Sahib Sikh Temple, Johor Bahru, Malaysia

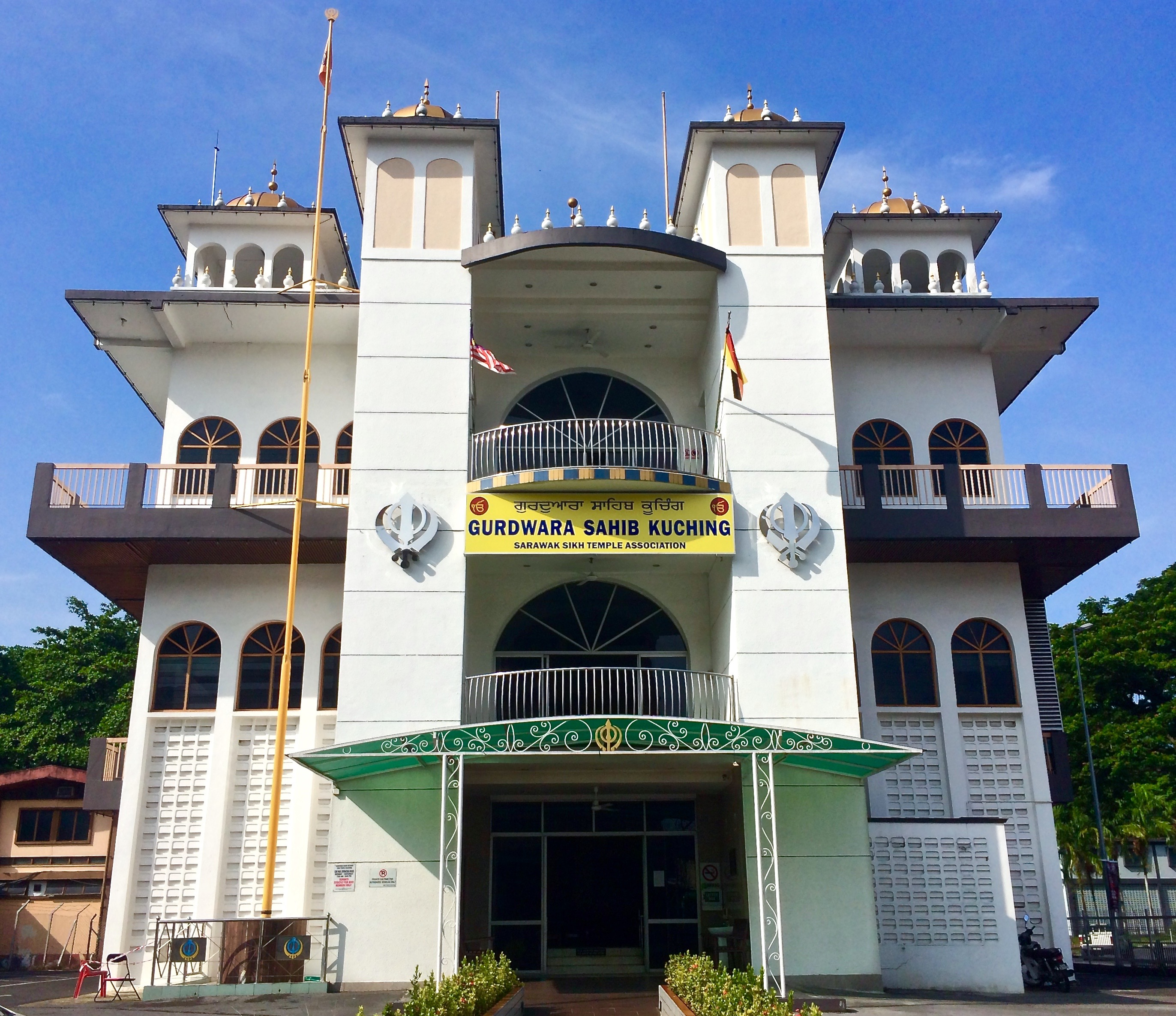
Gurdwara Sahib Kuching

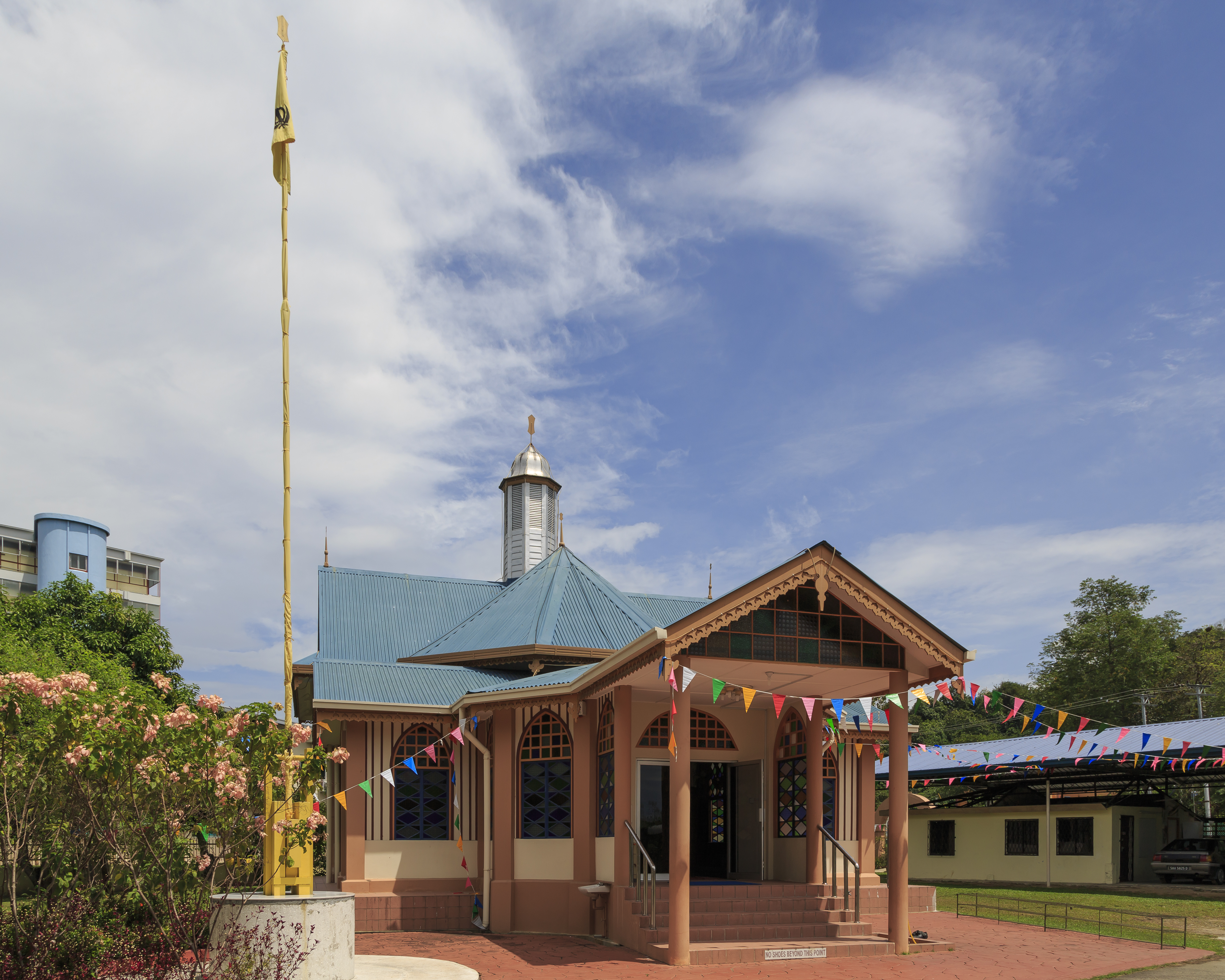
Kota Kinabalu Sabah Gurdwara Sahib

=== Former gurdwaras ===
- Malay States Guides Gurdwara – A gurdwara was located on the grounds of the former Malay States Guides military regiment in Larut, Taiping (established in 1896). However, it was situated within a military complex so civilians had difficulties worshipping at the gurdwara due to heightened security. The Malay States Guides was disbanded in 1919 and the gurdwara was closed the following year in 1920.

== List of Malaysian Sikhs ==
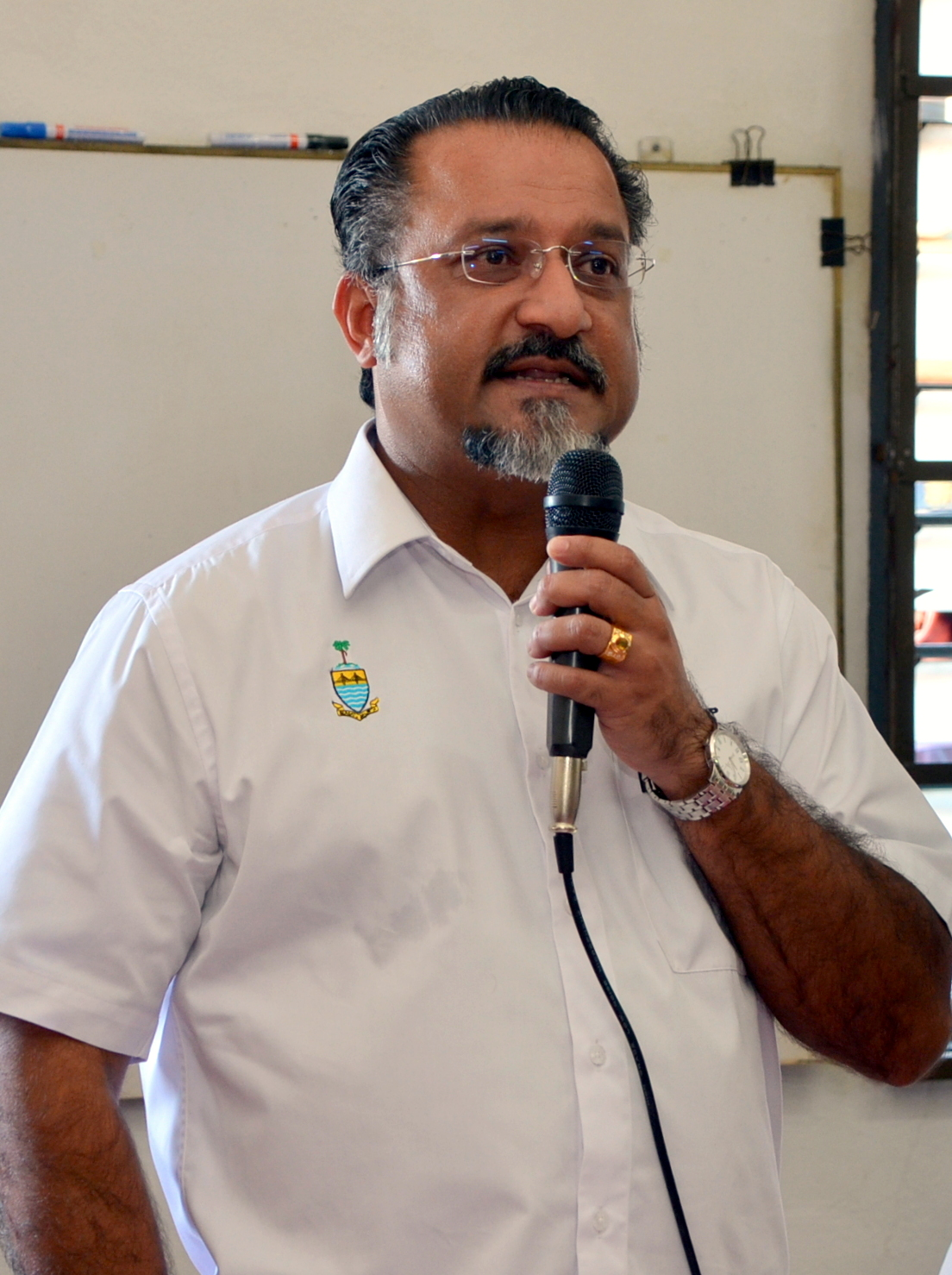
Jagdeep Singh Deo, who became the first Sikh to serve as a Deputy Chief Minister in Malaysia upon taking office as Penang's Deputy Chief Minister II on August 16, 2023.

- Melinder Bhullar - Model & Miss World Malaysia 2013 winner
- Satwant Singh Dhaliwal - Malaysian geneticist, academic and author
- Kiran Jassal - Model
- K. S. Nijhar - Former Malaysian MP and politician
- B. S. Rajhans - Malay film director
- Kavita Sidhu - Actress
- Baljit Singh - Former hockey player
- Baljit Singh - Hockey player
- Karam Singh Veriah - Former MP and political detainee
- Karamjit Singh - Malaysian professional rally car driver
- Karpal Singh - Malaysian politician and lawyer.
- Gobind Singh Deo - Malaysian politician, lawyer and Digital Minister.
- Jagdeep Singh Deo - Malaysian politician, lawyer and Penang Deputy Chief Minister.
- Ramkarpal Singh Deo - Malaysian politician and lawyer, former deputy law minister.
- Lall Singh - Cricketer
- Manrick Singh - Cricketer
- Ranjit Singh Malhi - Historian
- Sanjay Singh - Squash player
- Santokh Singh - Former Malaysian international football player
- Shebby Singh - Former Malaysian international football player
- Suresh Singh - Malaysian cricketer
- Anil Jeet Singh - Malaysian politician

== See also ==
- Jainism in Southeast Asia
- Hinduism in Southeast Asia
