= Wan Ji Wan Hussin =

Malaysian academic and preacher

Wan Ji Wan Hussin (born 12 January 1982) is an independent preacher, author and political activist formerly affiliated with the People's Justice Party in Malaysia.

He served a nine-month jail term for charges under the Sedition Act relating to his comments on the role of royalty in religion in Malaysia. Advocacy groups claimed that his jailing was politically motivated.

== Early years ==
Wan Ji was born in Pasir Mas, Kelantan on January 12, 1982. His father was a worker with the KL City Hall. He studied at the Lubuk Tapah religious school in Pasir Mas before continuing his studies at Jamia Farooqia in Karachi, Pakistan at the age of 17.

He went on to study Islamic law at the Al-Azhar University in Cairo, Egypt graduating with a degree in sharia law.

== Religious and political career ==
Upon his return to Malaysia he joined the Selangor PAS Ulama Council in 2008.

On 10 September 2014, he was arrested by the Royal Malaysian Police (PDRM) at his residence in Shah Alam.He was charged at the Shah Alam Sessions Court under Section 4 (1) (c) of the Sedition Act 1948 for insulting the Sultan of Selangor following his writings questioning the sultan's qualifications as a religious leader.

The comments had been made on a Facebook post on November 5, 2012.

Following the arrest, Wan Ji joined PKR in 2015 and was appointed as religious adviser and information officer to the Penang Chief Minister Lim Guan Eng in 2017.

An author of more than 10 books, his book titled Ulama yang bukan pewaris Nabi (2015) was banned in 2017. He also began a spell as a columnist at news portal Malaysiakini at this point.

He also criticised the Home Ministry's action in banning the use of the word "Allah" in the Malay version of the Bible.

== Prison sentence ==
In 2018, the Shah Alam Sessions Court sentenced him to nine months in prison for making seditious statements against the Sultan of Selangor, Sultan Sharafuddin Idris Shah.

Wan Ji then claimed he was physically assaulted by a warden with a thick Kelantanese accent during three days when he was held in Kajang prison.

In September 2023 the Court of Appeal here ordered Wan Ji to begin serving his nine-month prison sentence for publishing offensive words and insulting the Sultan of Selangor via Facebook.

This followed a unanimous decision by a panel of three judges led by Hadhariah Syed Ismail to reinstate the Shah Alam Sessions Court's decision, made on April 9, 2018, in sentencing Wan Ji to nine months in prison for the offence, and dismissed his appeal against the conviction and sentence.

In reinstating the Shah Alam Sessions Court's decision, Hadhariah also set aside the decision of the Shah Alam High Court in July 2019 which sentenced Wan Ji, 41, to one year in prison.

== After prison ==
After serving his sentence, he passed the viva voce (oral examination) to qualify for postgraduate studies in maqasid syariah at the Universiti Malaysia Kelantan.

In July 2025 a speech that he was scheduled to give at the Masjid Taman Sembilang in Penang was cancelled at the last minute.

On Jan 1, 2026 he announced that he was leaving PKR in order to reduce the number of enemies he had.
