= Ranjit Singh Malhi =

Malaysian historian

- Born: August 1, 1954 (age 72); Johor Bahru, Johor, Malaysia

Academic background
- Education: University of Malaya; Syracuse University

Ranjit Singh Malhi (born August 1, 1954) is a Malaysian historian and author known for his bestselling books on Malaysian history.

He has authored 29 books and also writes on leadership and organisation building.He is a regular contributor to leading Malaysian news portal Malaysiakini.

His penchant for highlighting forgotten or misrepresented aspects of Malaysian history has landed him in a number of contentious debates and he has repeatedly called for a thorough revision of Malaysia's history textbooks.

== Early life ==
Ranjit was born on August 1, 1954 in Johor Bahru. He underwent primary and secondary school education at Tapah, Perak. He initially studied at the University of Malaya before pursuing postgraduate studies in public administration at Syracuse University in the United States.

He later obtained a Doctor of Philosophy (PhD) from Asia e University, Malaysia. His doctoral research examined the anti-British political activities of Sikhs in colonial Malaya, a subject that subsequently became one of his principal research interests.

== Career ==
Ranjit worked in leadership development, executive education and management consulting for more than three decades and also served as an adjunct professor at the Asia Pacific University of Technology & Innovation (APU), Kuala Lumpur. His media articles frequently address leadership ethics, education reform, historical literacy and national unity, emphasising evidence-based decision-making, lifelong learning and responsible leadership.

=== Research ===
His historical research focused primarily on Malaysian history, the Sikh community in Malaysia, history education and multicultural nation-building. He also done substantial work on individual migrant communities as well as independence era leaders. He has argued that the study of history should be based on documentary evidence, historical accuracy and inclusive scholarship that recognises the contributions of Malaysia's diverse communities.

In 2021, he published History Textbooks and Divided Societies: The Malaysian Experience in The Round Table. It examined the role of history textbooks in shaping national identity in multi-ethnic societies and argued that history education should be factually accurate, balanced and inclusive.

In February 2021 he wrote Sikhs in Malaysia: A Comprehensive History, a guide to the community's history including its migration from Punjab to Malaya. He said it was a myth that Malaysian Sikhs were blindly loyal to the British colonialists and cited the tragic 1914 Komagata Maru incident and the 1919 Amritsar massacre.

In 2025, Ranjit published Forgotten Malaysian History: Restoring Voices, Reclaiming Truths, which examines overlooked aspects of Malaysian history and the representation of history in Malaysian school textbooks. He said the book sought to address factual distortions and omissions in the teaching of Malaysian history while advocating a more inclusive national narrative.

He has argued that the Hindu-Buddhist foundations of Malay civilisation have been overlooked and also weighed in on the dispute over the founding of Kuala Lumpur.

He also questioned if the May 13, 1969 riots were merely an overflow of racial tensions or also part of a political coup.

In 2026, he published Orang Asli: The forgotten first peoples of Peninsular Malaysia. He argued that textbooks were deliberately reducing the role and relevance of indigenous communities in the Malayan peninsula.

== Selected bibliography ==
Malhi has authored twenty-nine books on Malaysian history, Asian history, world history, leadership and management including:

- Make Yourself Employable: How Graduates Can Hit the Ground Running!.
- Enhancing Self-Esteem: Reengineering Yourself For Success In The New Millenium. 2007.
- Sikhs in Malaysia: A Comprehensive History. 2021.
- Forgotten Malaysian History: Restoring Voices, Reclaiming Truths. 2025.
- Orang Asli: The forgotten first peoples of Peninsular Malaysia. 2026.

=== Academic articles ===
- "Malayan Sikhs' participation in the Ghadar movement: From loyal British subjects to ardent revolutionaries". Sikh Formations. 17 (4): 435–449. 2021-10-11.
