= The Sun (Malaysia) =

English tabloid newspaper from Malaysia

The Sun Malaysia
- Type: Daily newspaper
- Format: Tabloid
- Owner(s): Sun Media Corporation Sdn. Bhd. (Berjaya Media Group)
- Founded: 1 June 1993
- Language: English
- Headquarters: Petaling Jaya, Selangor, Malaysia
- Circulation: 306,249 copies. (as of January–June 2015)
- Website: thesun.my

The Sun Malaysia (theSun) is Malaysia's national English-language daily newspaper in tabloid format, available seven days a week, aimed mainly at white-collar workers and urban youth.

Published by Sun Media Corporation Sdn Bhd, part of the Berjaya Media Group (formerly known as Nexnews Berhad), theSun was launched on 1 June 1993, which was originally The Sun. It stopped publication on 30 June 1994, for a revamp, and resumed a month later.

In audited circulation figures by Audit Bureau of Circulations Malaysia for January–June 2015, The Sun Malaysia was the highest circulated English newspaper in the country, with a circulation of 306,249.

== History ==
Sun Media Corporation Sdn Bhd (SMCSB) was incorporated in Malaysia under the Act on 19 July 1991 as a private limited company under the name of Fikiran Abadi Sdn Bhd. On 8 December 1994, it changed its name to Sun Media Group Sdn Bhd before assuming its present name on 22 August 1998.

The principal activity of SMCSB is the publication of theSun newspaper, an English language national daily that was launched in 1993. On 8 April 2002, theSun newspaper was relaunched as a free national daily.

On 4 March 2008, Berjaya Corporation Berhad acquired a substantial stake from the holding company, Nexnews Berhad, and consequently SMCSB has been announced to be a subsidiary of Berjaya Corporation Berhad. On 23 April 2008, Nexnews Berhad changed its name to Berjaya Media Berhad.

== Sections ==
theSun covers national and international news as well as sports, property, media & marketing and lifestyle & entertainment. It has been redesigned with plenty of news briefs to cater to the reading habits of busy executives - the paper's target audience.

theSun weekend was launched in the weekend of 15–16 May 2004, a revamp of its Saturday issue. It was discontinued in March 2006 due to its inconsistency with the free paper model.

== Target audience ==
As of 2010, theSun prints and distributes 300,512 copies a day to approximately 3,337 targeted distribution points, called SunSpots (office buildings, condominiums, LRT stations, fast food outlets), primarily in the Klang Valley, also known as Kuala Lumpur Metropolitan Area. People can also get a copy of theSun in almost all Malaysian 7-Eleven stores or pay a newsvendor to deliver the paper to their homes. The paper's circulation is audited by the Audit Bureau of Circulation (ABC).

In 2006, prompted by the rising demand for copies and advertisers' thirst for a wider reach, theSun, increased its print run by 76%. The increase took place in two phases, the first on 8 March, with circulation bumped up to 230,000 from 150,000 previously. The second phase saw circulation rising by another 15% to 265,000 copies on 2 October. Out of that, 215,000 copies are distributed in the Klang Valley, solidifying theSun's position as the top English daily in the nation's top consumer region.

== Awards ==
theSun has won several awards for advertising. The Association of Accredited Advertising Agents Malaysia (4As) has awarded theSun the Media Partner of the Year Award (2004/2005). In the recent Malaysian Media Awards 2005, advertisements by MindShare/Nike and mediaedge:cia/ING Insurance published in theSun won Gold and Silver awards respectively.

In March 2007, theSun achieved another milestone when three of its journalists won top awards given by the Society of Publishers in Asia (SOPA) based in Hong Kong. SOPA, the Asian equivalent of the Pulitzer Prize in the United States, picked theSun for Excellence in Public Service Journalism and Opinion Writing. The competition included more established regional publications.

A first award, for Excellence in Opinion Writing, was for a series of six commentaries written by assistant news editor Jacqueline Ann Surin, who wrote a fortnightly column, Shape of a Pocket, published in the eXtra! section on Thursday. Surin beat an entry from the Far Eastern Economic Review's series of commentaries on Singapore, which received an honorary mention.

theSun's second win, for Public Service Journalism, was for the story "Low Cost Palace" by the Special Reporting and Investigations team of editor R. Nadeswaran and deputy news editor Terence Fernandez who exposed the illegal mansion built by a former Selangor executive councillor.

SOPA again gave theSun two awards in 2008; honourable mentions for Terence Fernancez and R. Nadeswaran in Public Service Journalism for their reports on the failed sports training centre in Brickendonbury and for R. Nadeswaran for Opinion Writing for his Citizen Nades bi-weekly columns.

theSun has also won a number of Malaysian journalism awards for entertainment writing and investigative reporting.

== Criticism ==
During the 1994 revamp of the newspaper, The Sun has been criticised for using a national flag in the masthead for commercial purposes. The Home Ministry said that the newspaper should not use the national flag in the masthead without permission. The newspaper resumed publication on 1 August 1994.

== See also ==
- List of newspapers in Malaysia
