= List of Crimewatch (Singaporean TV series) episodes =

This is the list of episodes of Crimewatch since 1993, with airing timings for the show from 2009 onwards.

Crimewatch is aired in four different languages through Mediacorp. The Mandarin version, 绳之以法, is aired on Channel 8. The English version, Crimewatch, is aired on Channel 5. The Tamil version, Kutra Kannkaanippu, is aired on Vasantham. The Malay version, Jejak Jenayah, is aired on Suria. The show is also accessible in all four languages through mewatch.

== Series overview ==
Airdates based on English language showings only.

=== 1980s ===
Season	Episodes	Originally aired	
Season	Episodes	First aired	Last aired
Pilot		30 November 1986	
1	4 (Ep. 1–4)	18 January 1987	
2	4 (Ep. 5–8)	11 June 1988	
3	4 (Ep. 9–12)	2 October 1989	

=== 1990s ===
Season	Episodes	Originally aired	
Season	Episodes	First aired	Last aired
4	4 (Ep. 13–16)	January 1, 1990	
5	4 (Ep. 17–20)	January 1, 1991	
6	4 (Ep. 21–24)	January 1, 1992	
7	6	February 17, 1993	
8	10	January 10, 1994	
9	10	November 5, 1995	
10	10	October 15, 1996	
11	10	February 17, 1998	
12	10	October 25, 1998	
13	10	October 24, 1999	

=== 2000s ===
Season	Episodes	Originally aired		Season	Episodes	Originally aired	
Season	Episodes	First aired	Last aired	Season	Episodes	First aired	Last aired
14	10	September 27, 2000		19	10	June 20, 2004	
15	10	November 14, 2001		20	10	February 20, 2005	
16	10	June 12, 2002		21	10	September 18, 2006	
17	10	January 8, 2003		22	10	May 14, 2007	
18	10	September 17, 2003		23	10	22 March 2009	20 December 2009

=== 2010s ===
Season	Episodes	Originally aired		Season	Episodes	Originally aired	
Season	Episodes	First aired	Last aired	Season	Episodes	First aired	Last aired
24	10	28 March 2010	19 December 2010	29	10	22 March 2015	20 December 2015
25	11	27 March 2011	29 January 2012	30	10	27 March 2016	18 December 2016
26	10	25 March 2012	23 December 2012	31	10	26 March 2017	17 December 2017
27	10	24 March 2013	29 December 2013	32	10	25 March 2018	23 December 2018
28	10	23 March 2014	28 December 2014	33	10	24 March 2019	22 December 2019

=== 2020s ===
Season	Episodes	Originally aired		Season	Episodes	Originally aired	
Season	Episodes	First aired	Last aired	Season	Episodes	First aired	Last aired
34	10	22 March 2020	21 February 2021	39	10	March 2025	December 2025
35	10	25 April 2021	27 February 2022				
36	10	25 April 2022	12 February 2023				
37	10	19 March 2023	17 December 2023				
38	10	24 March 2024	22 December 2024				

== Episodes ==
=== Pilot (1986) ===
No.	Title	Description
1	"Pilot" / "Crimewatch: Opening"	
2	"Pilot 2"	
3	"Pilot 3"	

=== Season 7 (1993) ===
No.	Title	Description
1	"Ep 1"	This episode focuses on: an armed robbery of a moneychanger by a group of Filipinos; how police use fingerprints to solve crimes; the unsolved robbery-cum-murder of Wong Siam Loon at Bukit Batok Street 11 on 22 September 1992
2	"Youth Gang / Triple Gold Bar Murder"	This episode focuses on: youth gangs; the Gold bars triple murders that took place in 1971
3	"CNB Raid / Operation Dayang / Misuse of '999' / Ang Mo Kio Ave 10 Murder"	This episode focuses on: Central Narcotics Bureau raids; Operation Dayang, a joint crackdown with the Malaysia Royal Police; the unsolved murder of Ng Swee Hai that occurred on 15 February 1993
4	"Community Policing / Geylang East Murder / Singapore's Most Notorious Kidnapper – Fong"	This episode focuses on: community policing, a joint program by neighbourhoods and the police; an unsolved murder that occurred near Geylang East Swimming Complex on 8 February 1993; a notorious kidnapper in Singapore
5	"Apparent Suicide / Avoid Getting Pickpocketed / Teck Whye Cres Murder / Bedok Reservoir Rd Murder"	This episode focuses on: the 'apparent' suicide of Yvonne Lim on 16 June 1987; how to avoid becoming a pickpocketing victim; appealing for witnesses for a murder that occurred at Teck Whye Crescent on 4 August 1993; an unsolved murder case that occurred at Bedok Reservoir Road
6	"Singapore's 1970s Secret Society Most Notorious Man Gia Kang / House-breaking Prevention"	This episode focuses on: Anthony Low, a policeman who arrested one of 1970s Singapore's most notorious secret society members, Gia Kang; an unsolved case of an unnoticed bank robbery; how to avoid becoming a pickpocketing victim as well as how to prevent house break-ins

=== Season 8 (1994) ===
No.	Title	Description
1	"Ep 1"	This episode focuses on: an armed robbery of a jewellery manufacturer; traffic police operations; the unsolved murder of a taxi driver Yeo Kang Loon on 6 November 1992 at Mar Thoma Road
2	"Brutal Murder / Gang Rape / Balancing on Two Wheels"	This episode focuses on: the then-unsolved murder of a professor on 12 December 1993; a gang rape of an 18-year-old girl on 10 June 1992 along Changi Coast Road
3	"ATM Fraud / Hougang Murder"	This episode focuses on: automated teller machine fraud by a syndicate; the unsolved murder of an 80-year-old woman at her house on 8 January 1994 in Hougang; the murder of a 15-year-old in a gang-related attack
4	"On The Run For 7 Years / STAR Unit / Woodlands Centre Robbery"	This episode focuses on: the tracking down of a murder suspect for 7 years; operations of the "Special Tactics And Rescue" (STAR) unit, including in the Tiong Bahru bus hijacking; an unsolved robbery in Woodlands
5	"Abduction-cum-Robbery / Photofit / One-way Mirror"	This episode focuses on: an abduction-cum-robbery; an unsolved robbery at Upper Serangoon Road
6	"Granny Mugger / Consequences of Illegal Moneylending"	This episode focuses on: Sahad Bin Ahmad, who earned the nickname "Granny Mugger" due to his vicious beatings of old people before robbing them; illegal moneylending and its consequences; an unsolved case regarding Anthony Samuel; after advertising in the newspaper regarding legal moneylending, he fled Singapore on 29 April 1994 after taking the borrower's deposit
7	"Ep 7"	This episode focuses on: two serial rapists who abducted women on the streets into their van to rape and rob them; how the police handle rape reports; the then-unsolved Oriental Hotel murder
8	"Telephone Conman / Gang Fight"	This episode focuses on: a telephone conman; a gang fight; an unsolved case
9	"Expressways / Causes To Accidents / Joo Chiat Goldsmith Robbery / Dentist Murder"	This episode focuses on: expressways, and how to stay safe while driving on them; the robbery of a goldsmith in Joo Chiat; the unsolved murder of a 52-year-old dentist
10	"Ep 10"	* Re-enactment of the Kuah Bee Hong murder case

=== Season 9 (1995) ===
No.	Title	Description
1	"Ep 1"	This episode focuses on: an armed robbery of a goldsmith shop; a serial molester who targeted schoolgirls on public buses; unsolved robbery at Tanjong Pagar Plaza
2	"Pornography Videos Crackdown / Pornography Addiction"	This episode focuses on: the murder of Ho Hon Sing; police operations against distributors of pornographic videos
3	"Kidnap of Goldsmith Shop Owner / Police Dogs Training / Siglap Centre $150k Armed Robbery"	This episode focuses on: the kidnapping and death of goldsmith shop owner Phang Tee Wah; how police dogs assist in police operations; unsolved murder at Serangoon Road on 21 March 1995
4	"Singapore's Largest Drug Haul"	This episode focuses on: Singapore's largest drug haul and arrest of Lu Lai Heng; unsolved rape and murder in Serangoon North on 21 March 1995
5	"Bukit Timah Ave Robbery & Murder / Road Safety Tips"	This episode focuses on: the robbery and murder of lorry driver Yeu Lam Ching; road safety tips; unsolved stabbing of an 8-year-old boy in Ang Mo Kio on 23 May 1995
6	"Motorcycle Gang / Jurong Fish Market Armed Robbery"	This episode focuses on: a gang which stole motorcycles in Singapore to sell in Malaysia; safety tips for motorcycle riders; unsolved armed robbery at Jurong Fish Market on 20 June 1995
7	"Singapore Coast Guard / Brutal Murder & Sexual Assault at Jln Woodbridge"	This episode focuses on: Feature on the Singapore Coast Guard; Brutal murder and sexual assault of Lim Shiow Rong; Attempted house-breaking and police chase which resulted in the murder of police officer Mirza Abdul Halim
8	"Street Gangs & Secret Society / Senseless Killing / Mandarin Hotel Rape & Robbery"	This episode focuses on: the death of a teenager; unsolved rape and robbery of two Japanese tourists at the Mandarin Hotel on 8 August 1995; unsolved murder in Ang Mo Kio on 5 September 1995
9	"Random Serial Molester / Far East Shopping Ctr Murder"	This episode focuses on: arrest of a serial molester; unsolved robbery of a goldsmith shop in Tampines on 19 July 1995; a man wanted in relation to a murder at Far East Shopping Centre
10	"Mystery Burnt Car & its Skeletal Remains"	This episode focuses on: the murder of Tan Heng Hong; the dangers of drink-driving; unsolved attempted robbery of a bank at King George's Avenue on 26 September 1995

=== Season 10 (1996) ===
No.	Title	Description
1	"Ep 1"	This episode focuses on: armed robbery and shootout at a goldsmith shop at South Bridge Road; hit-and-run accidents; an unsolved armed robbery
2	"Taxi Driver Murder / Rise in Juvenile Delinquency / PSA Alexandra District Park Brutal Murder"	This episode focuses on: murder of taxi driver Teo Kim Hock and extortion from his family; juvenile delinquency; an unsolved murder at the PSA Alexandra District Park
3	"Taman Jurong Gang / Conman Tricks / Golden Landmark Building Murder"	This episode focuses on: a gang-related attack which resulted in the death of Sivapragasam Subramaniam; conman tricks; an unsolved murder at the Golden Landmark Building
4	"Drug and Firearm Syndicate / Hardcore Drug Addicts / Ang Mo Kio Ave 3 Murder"	This episode focuses on: a drug and firearms smuggling syndicate; hardcore drug addicts; an unsolved murder at Ang Mo Kio Avenue 3
5	"Mystery of the Body Parts / Road Shoulder Abuse / Hogan St $200k Armed Robbery"	This episode focuses on: British killer John Martin Scripps; road shoulder abuse; an unsolved armed robbery in Hougang
6	"Robbery of Jewelry Factory Owner / Credit Card Fraud"	This episode focuses on: The robbery of a jewelry factory owner, Kory Guan, on Dec 1994; A credit card fraud and prevention on accepting counterfeited credit cards
7	"Broad Daylight Murder / Hong Leong Ctr Gang Robbery"	This episode focuses on: Murder of Sim Ah Lek; Gang robbery took place at Hong Leong Centre by trio
8	"Murder of Moneychanger / Tips on how to avoid house-breaks / Soon Wing Rd Murder / Pacific Plaza Murder"	This episode focuses on: the murder of Moneychanger Shamsul Hameed; How to avoid house-breaks; Hwee Siew Kong was murdered at Soon Wing Road; the murder of Benny Han
9	"How to lease out your home"	This episode focuses on: Homeowners and how to lease out your home
10	"Bedok North St Robbery & Murder / Designer Drug – Ecstasy / Upper Changi Rd Robbery"	This episode focuses on: Bedok North lift murder; Ecstasy, the designer drug; robbery took place at Upper Changi Rd by duo

=== Season 11 (1997) ===
No.	Title	Description
1	"Ep 1"	Crimewatch is a docu-drama series that showcases the crimes solved by the Singapore Police Force and also promotes public awareness towards trending crimes.
2	"Bogus Money Laundering Nigerian Syndicate / Mobile Data Terminal / Counterfeit Syndicate"	This episode focuses on: bogus money laundering by a Nigerian syndicate that targeted Singaporeans; latest equipment for patrol officers; a solved case regarding a 6-person syndicate that exchanged counterfeit foreign notes at banks; an unsolved case
3	"Illegal Handphone Cloning / Neighbourhood Watch Zone / Protect Children in Cars"	This episode focuses on: the inside track of a syndicate that illegally cloned handphones in 1996; the Neighbourhood Watch Zone, where public-spirited residents help in solving crimes together with the NPs; how to protect your children while in a vehicle; the unsolved case of Loh Ay Yun who was brutally assaulted in April 1997 along Circuit Road
4	"Biggest International Drug Trafficking Syndicate / Consequences of Ecstasy / Speed-related Accidents"	This episode focuses on: the Central Narcotics Bureau tracking down and arresting James Goh Jun Tong, the man behind one of the biggest international drug trafficking syndicates, together with Koh Chuan Kuang and Jeffrey Tan Seng Kim.; the consequences of ecstasy; speed-related road accidents where victims were killed by reckless drivers; an unsolved case
5	"Gang Rioting / Juvenile Delinquency Testimonials / Considerate Driving / Bukit Timah Rd Robbery"	This episode focuses on: a gang riot that took place on 30 July 1995, killing a 14-year-old passer-by in the process; juvenile delinquency with testimonials; tips for considerate driving on roads; the unsolved robbery of a house at Bukit Timah Road that took place on 9 June 1997
6	"Seemingly Perfect Robbery / Protect Against House Break-in / Speeding / Bedok South Rd Robbery & Murder"	This episode focuses on: the solving of a robbery case that took place on 9 December 1996 at a jewelry factory at Toa Payoh Industrial Park; how to protect your house from break-ins; the dangers of speeding; the unsolved robbery and murder of Siew Hiew along Bedok South Road that took place on 22 June 1997
7	"Broad Daylight Armed Robbery / Magic Stones / Lentor Ave Hit-and-Run"	This episode focuses on: a solved case of broad daylight armed robbery that took place on 22 June 1995 at People's Park Complex, where Lim Chwee Soon became the first person to be hanged after the implementation of the amended firearm law; how innocent victims fall prey to a conman selling magic stones and electric parts.; how young children are vulnerable to road accidents, and how parents can prevent such dangers; the unsolved hit-and-run of Hee Hock on 30 August 1997 at Lentor Avenue by a green lorry
8	"Matching the Print" (see: Oriental Hotel murder)	This episode focuses on: the solving of a case regarding a hotel robbery and murder suspect
9	"Hit-and-run or Murder? / Drink Driving & Phone Driving / Harboring Illegal Immigrants / Rochor Ctr Murder"	This episode focuses on: a seemingly hit-and-run that later revealed to be a murder by Tamamar Razu that took place on 24 November 1996; the dangers of drink driving and phone driving; the consequences of harboring illegal immigrants; the unsolved murder of a 28-year-old at Rochor Centre on 19 August 1997
10	"Kranji Loop Burglars / Ice Menace / Dangers and Vulnerability of Motorcycles"	This episode focuses on: a solved case where the police nabbed burglary suspects less than a day after the latter's shoe prints were lifted from the crime scene at Kranji Loop; ice menace; dangers and vulnerabilities of motorcycles

=== Season 12 (1998) ===
No.	Title	Description
1	"Ep 1"	Crimewatch is a docu-drama series that showcases the crimes solved by the Singapore Police Force and also promotes public awareness towards trending crimes.
2	"Love Relationship-turned-Tragedy / Illegal Immigrants Influx / Woodlands Interchange Murder"	This episode focuses on: a love relationship turned tragedy after a man stabbed her ex-girlfriend to death on 4 October 1996; how the police tackles the influx of illegal immigrants; the unsolved rape and murder of Dini Haryati on 4 January 1998 near Woodlands MRT
3	"HDB Protection Rackets / One-stop Policing"	This episode focuses on: protection rackets that were being secretly operated by secret society groups under the guise of renovation contractors; one-stop policing; an appeal for witnesses regarding the murder of 52-year-old Tng Chai Huat who was last seen leaving his flat with large sums of money and discovered dead near Lim Chu Kang Road four days later
4	"Operation Scarlet / Heroin Abuse / Campbell Ln Murder"	This episode focuses on: why people still engage in drug trafficking despite harsh punishments; heroin addiction; an unsolved murder at Campbell Lane that took place in March 1998; contacting a potential witness regarding a murder that took place in March 1998
5	"Setting Torch on Bikes / Beating the Red Light"	This episode focuses on: the arrest of Neo Chin Kui on 29 November 1997 for setting torches on bikes between 1996 and November 1997; issues that endanger safety on the road, particularly speeding and running red lights; an unsolved murder of two prostitutes that took place on 26 April 1998
6	"Whampoa Dr Murder / IP Copyrights / Prevention of Vehicle Theft"	This episode focuses on: the murder of Saravanan Michael Ramalingam at Whampoa Drive by Asogan Ramesh Ramachandren, Selvar Kumar Silvaras, and Mathavakannan Kalimuthu; intellectual property copyrights; the prevention of vehicle theft; an unsolved robbery of a man involving $36,000 worth of foreign currencies
7	"Hillview Terrace Factory Break-in / Rise of Snatch Thefts / Illegal Parking / Parkway Parade Attempt"	This episode focuses on: a series of break-ins in 1997 by a drug addict; snatch theft and common locations; illegal parking; an attempted robbery at Parkway Parade; information and picture of the culprit was released
8	"Robbing Lone Drivers at Night / Illegal VCDs / Yio Chu Kang Brutal Murder"	This episode focuses on: the arrest of three robbers who targeted lone drivers late at night; how the authorities clamp down on illegal distribution of obscene and uncensored video compact discs; an unsolved death of a woman, who was found on 23 September 1998 highly decomposed with numerous slash wounds
9	"Gambling in the Woods / It's not worth going to jail! / Whampoa Robbery & Murder"	This episode focuses on: illegal booking and punting centres operating in Singapore; a video that attempts to dissuade youngsters from entering a life of crime; the robbery and murder of a grandmother in Whampoa that took place on 19 October 1998
10	"Snatch Theft / Credit Card Cloning / Year-end Crime Prevention Campaign 98/99"	This episode focuses on: a solved case of snatch theft; the thieves were arrested 18 minutes after the theft; a scam regarding the cloning of credit cards and selling them; a year-end crime prevention campaign in respect for the upcoming holiday season; the search for a couple who can potentially assist in the police's investigations regarding a series of criminal breach of trust amounting to $240,000

=== Season 13 (1999) ===
No.	Title	Description
1	"Ep 1"	Crimewatch is a docu-drama series that showcases the crimes solved by the Singapore Police Force and also promotes public awareness towards trending crimes.
2	"Landlady Murder / 50 Years in SPF / New Warrant Cards / Jurong West Murder"	This episode focuses on: the murder of a landlady; female police officers celebrating 50 years in the Singapore Police Force; new warrant cards for Central Narcotics Bureau officers; a murder that occurred at Block 498 along Jurong West Street 41 by two men
3	"Rape Through Deceit / Internet & Audiotext Dangers"	This episode focuses on: rape through deceit; the dangers of the Internet and audiotext due to presence of sexual offenders using Internet Relay Chat; the murder of Salim bin Ahmad at Nikmath Restaurant on 2 May 1999
4	"Codename Amber / Bedok Reservoir Rd Murder"	This episode focuses on: the crippling of an international drug syndicate through an operation codenamed "Amber"; the murder of Lee Teik Seng along Bedok Reservoir Road
5	"Crime Rate Statistics / Cat Burglar – HDB Spiderman Break-ins"	This episode focuses on: crime rate statistics for the first half of 1999; Spiderman break-ins of Housing and Development Board flats; fatal accidents and speeding on the road, leading to the introduction of mobile stealth laser camera detectors; the murder of Aw Teck Boon along Geylang Road on 5 May 1999
6	"Case of the Bulgarian Woman"	This episode focuses on: a murder of a Bulgarian woman that took place on 13 January 1998; the Singapore Civil Defence Force's Community Safety & Security Programme
7	"Katong Park Hotel Murder"	This episode focuses on: the death of a man by suffocation after a woman punishes him for demanding sex for a job; the police's search for three suspects who were involved in the 18 July 1999 murder of Tong Beng Wah
8	"5 Robbers, 3 Hostages / Family Violence Network System"	This episode focuses on: a hostage situation in March 1999 and the arrest of three of the robbers in Malaysia; the Family Violence Network System
9	"Motor Vehicle Theft Syndicate / Family Quarrel Murder"	This episode focuses on: how the police busted a group responsible for 150 motor vehicle thefts between April and July 1998; illegal immigrants and the risks they take to work in Singapore; the unsolved murder case of Koh Ah Heng who was killed during a family quarrel
10	"Stalker & Molester / Dangers Cyclists Face"	This episode focuses on: the police hunting down 24-year-old Pua Sor Keong who stalked and molested women returning home late from work between January and March; the dangers cyclists face

=== Season 14 (2000) ===
No.	Title	Description
1	Part 1: Singapore Crime Statistics; Part 2: Bukit Batok Rape & Murder	This episode focuses on: Con-men selling lottery tickets, and a fire outbreak; Death of Linda Chua
2	Part 1: Prevent Vehicle Theft; Part 2: Unsolved Murder Case	This episode focuses on: Three armed men hold up a family at their home and rob them of cash and valuables worth over $90,000; an unsolved murder of Gunalan S/O Sathasivam
3	Part 1: Lift Robberies; Part 2: Dangers of Speeding	This episode focuses on: Pick pockets in lift; The dangers of speeding Overseas brokers
4	Part 1: The Biggest Heroin Seizure; Part 2: Drug Use Dangers	This episode focuses on: the biggest heroin seizure in its history; CNB smashed a drug syndicate
5	Part 1: Consequences of Illegal Moneylending; Part 2: Rape Case; Part 3: Marine Parade Snatch Theft	This episode focuses on: Consequences of illegal Moneylending; rape case by Christopher Nathan on a 27 years old handicap woman in Toa Payoh; appeal for help for snatch theft at Marine Parade
6	Part 1: Robbery Conspiracy; Part 2: Con Artist Tricks	This episode focuses on: robbery case that took place on 21 Sep 2000 was resolved; how you can prevent yourself from falling victim to a con artist
7	Part 1: Arson; Part 2: Internet Crimes; Part 3: Geylang Armed Robbery	This episode focuses on: A case of arson by Steven Tel; Issues with the internet crime; armed robbery took place at Geylang East Ave 3 on a jewelry owner
8	Part 1: City Plaza Kidnap	This episode focuses on: the kidnapping of Vincent Lee Chuan Leong and con man who cons using magic paper and a robbery at City Plaza
9	Part 1: Housebreaking-turned-rape; Part 2: Community Hero; Part 3: Hit-and-run accident	This episode focuses on: house-breaking cases that turned to rape by Adrian Chew Eng Hin; how community hero help solve a robbery case; how a hit-and-run case that took place on 14 March 1999
10	Part 1: Brutal Murder; Part 2: Copyright issues Part 3: UN East Timor Mission	This episode focuses on: Brutal murder of a 50-year-old fruit stall assistant, Tan Eng Yan; Copyright issues and how it affects us; Story of policemen who went to East Timor for a mission

=== Season 15 (2001) ===
No.	Title	Description
1	Part 1: Murder of T. Maniam; Part 2: CSSP for market fire Part 3: Police Coast Guard	This episode focuses on: Murder of T. Maniam; CSSP for market fire; a crew commander of the Police Coast Guard
2	Part 1: A Day in the Life of an SIO; Part 2: CSSP for Schools Part 3: Date Rape	This episode focuses on: A day in the life of a Senior Investigation Officer (SIO) and his team as they go on their 24-hour tour of duty; CSSP of a different nature - School Watch Group; Rape of a teenage Malay girl at Bedok Reservoir Park by a Thai construction worker
3	Part 1: Magic Stone; Part 2: Transforming Juvenile Delinquents Part 3: Tampines Mall Group Fight	This episode focuses on: A magic stone turns a cup of water black; juvenile delinquents be transformed; a group fight in Tampines Mall
4	Part 1: Operation Dragnet; Part 2: Ayer Rajah RC; Part 3: Operation Sentinel	This episode focuses on: highlights CNB's relentless enforcement against drug activities; RC members from Ayer Rajah; the arrest of a drug pusher which leads CNB on a trail of one out of the five Malay drug syndicates
5	Part 1: Scene of Crime Officers; Part 2: Mischef of Arson Part 3: Jln Lekar Murder	This episode focuses on: scene of crime officers who link the component of the case into a complete package with their latest gadgets.; Theft and mischief of arson at Ang Mo Kio Industrial Park; Murder of Ang Cen Heng at Jalan Lekar
6	Part 1: Work Permit Forgery Syndicate / Part 2: Little India Foreign Workers Part 3: Dead at Belilios Ln	This episode focuses on: Work Permit Forgery Syndicate; Problems and solutions of foreign workers in Little India; Xu Wen Xia was found dead at Belilios Lane
7	Part 1: The STAR Unit Part 2: Crime Prevention Tips for Elderly Part 3: Unsolved murder of Cheong Chee Fye	This episode focuses on: The STAR unit; Tracking down of Mohd Hassan Bin Mohd Arshad, the killer of an elderly widow at her home; Cheong Chee Fye was threw down the flat at Toa Payoh by 2 men
8	Bugis St Hooligans	This episode focuses on: Hooligans at Bugis Street where the loanshark
9	Neighbourhood Police / Stabbed to Death at Bukit Batok	This episode focuses on: Duties of neighborhood police in our community; Death of Soh San at Bukit Batok Ave 8
10	CCSP / Hougang HDB Spiderman	This episode focuses on: What CCSP do to help in our community; How conman mislead job seekers to depart with their money; Hougang HDB spiderman, where Johari Bin Ahmad climbs over walls and breaks into houses; Krishnan S/O Sengal Rajah was beaten to death by 2 men at Madras Street.

=== Season 16 (2002) ===
No.	Title	Description
1	"Family Violence / Pasir Ris Dr Taxi Driver Murder / Sirat Rd Murder"	This episode focuses on: the murder of taxi driver Ong Huay Dee; family violence; the unsolved murder of Chay See Choy
2	"Rear Seat Belts / Bukit Batok House-break / Death of Cheu Mien Kuen"	This episode focuses on: the importance of rear seat belts; a case of house-breaking in Bukit Batok; the unsolved murder of Cheu Mien Kuen
3	"Kidnapped / Property Swindlers / Changi Airport Murder"	This episode focuses on: the kidnapping of Tay Teng Joo; property swindlers; the unsolved murder of June Seow
4	"Operation Osprey / Woodlands Robbery"	This episode focuses on: a CNB operation to bust a drug syndicate; unsolved robbery
5	"The Anthony Ler Case / African E-mail Scam / The Northern Loner"	This episode focuses on: the murder of Annie Leong by a teenage killer hired by her husband Anthony Ler; African e-mail scams; a lone robber who preys on senior citizens at Canberra Road and Bukit Batok estate
6	"Bukit Merah Estate Serial Robber / Tampines Serial Sex Offenders / Kallang River Death"	This episode focuses on: a serial lift robber in Bukit Merah; a serial sex offender targeting young children in Tampines; the unsolved murder of Li Yan Jie at the Kallang River
7	"Pyromaniac at Tampines / The Rape Squad / Youth Crimes"	This episode focuses on: an arsonist who set fires to public areas in Tampines; a rapist who found his victims through the Internet; youth crimes
8	Police Coast Guard / Speeding / Bank Client	This episode focuses on: operations of the Police Coast Guard; speedsters in Lim Chu Kang; two people tricking a 64-year-old man by accusing him of stealing money from a bag
9	"Poisoning of Mineral Water / Jelapang Rd Serial House-breaker / Gilstead Rd Snatch Theft"	This episode focuses on: spiking of mineral water at a RC meeting with caused the death of an elderly woman; serial house-breaker at Jelapang Road; unsolved snatch theft at Gilstead Road
10	"Murders of Taxi Driver at Chestnut Dr & Moneychanger at Jln Kukoh"	This episode focuses on: the unsolved murder of taxi driver Lee Yang Joo at Jurong Road, Track 22; the murder of taxi driver Koh Ngiap Yong at Chestnut Drive and moneychanger Jahabar Sathick at Jalan Kukoh

=== Season 17 (2003) ===
No.	Title	Description
1	PRC Worker Murder / Mystic Cheats / Spanish Lottery Scams	This episode focuses on: gunman Lim Keng Peng; Murder of a PRC worker at Rangoon Road.; Mystic cheats; Spanish lottery scams; Missing person - Mdm Mak Sum Nui, a 57-year-old female Chinese who was last seen on 7 Feb 02 at her flat at Blk 43 Holland Drive
2	The Arrest of "Carlos" / IRC Rapist / Child Molesters	This episode focuses on: The arrest of "Carlos"; Internet Relay Chatline rapist; Child molesters - heartbeats & letterboxes
3	Counterfeit Currency Syndicate / Lift Robberies / Credit Card Thief	This episode focuses on: Counterfeit currency syndicate; Crimes against the elderly: lift robberies; Credit card thief
4	4 PH 50 / Psychotropic Drug - ICE / "Ah Por"	This episode focuses on: In the line of duty - PH 50; Psychotropic drugs; "Ah Por"
5	Teck Whye Ln Death / Handphone Crimes	This episode focuses on: Death at Teck Whye Lane; Handphone crimes
6	Bedok North Death / Telok Blangah Serial Taxi Robber / Macritchie Reservoir Attack	This episode focuses on: Death at Bedok North; The serial taxi robber of Telok Blangah; Macritchie Reservoir attack Wanted man - Tay Ann Hin
7	The Arrest of Northern Loner / The Arrest of Mystic Cheats / Credit Card Frauds	This episode focuses on: Police case first brought up in Crimewatch 2002, Episode 5; The Arrest of Mystic Cheats; Credit Card Frauds
8	The Crippling of a Moneylending Syndicate	This episode focuses on: How police caught moneylender Anthoni Ang Beng Chee; Solved Case on House-breaking; Conmen pray on kindness of victims for loans of money
9	SLE Hit-and-run / Drink Driving Story	This episode focuses on: Hit-and-run at SLE; Lim Koon Heng's drink driving story
10	Canberra Rd Death / Shop Theft	This episode focuses on: Death at Block 303 Canberra Road; Shop Theft

=== Season 18 (2004) ===
No.	Title	Description
1	Illegal Immigrants / Toh Guan Rd Murder / Credit Card Fraud	This episode focuses on: Illegal immigrants from Malaysia; Murder of Shahrul Hameed s/o Malikkan Pilla; a credit card scam
2	Operation "Firestone" / Hawkers Cheated	This episode focuses on: Operation ""Firestone""; Hawkers Cheated; Manhunt for SARS robber
3	Taxi Con / K9 Tails / Cherry-picking at Sales - Do's and Don'ts	This episode focuses on: Scamming of taxi drivers's phones; Training sniffer dogs; Spread awareness about how to avoid being robbed when shopping
4	Ah Dan - The Elusive Drug Trafficker / Fake Cop / The Speed Camera	This episode focuses on: CNB locates drug trafficker Ah Dan; Police impersonation scam; Road police using speed camera to capture the speed of cars.
5	DNA Tracks / Toh Guan Road Armed Robbery	This episode focuses on: Scientist using DNA technology to solve a housebreaking case.; armed robbery at Toh Guan Road
6	Murdered at Home	This episode focuses on: A lady who was robbed and murdered by one of her Mahjong friend.
7	Special Operations Command / Money in Dustbin Ruse / Outraged Modesty at Yishun Ring Rd	This episode focuses on: Special Operations Command; Con artists who convince people to put money in a dustbin; A man pretending to be a teacher at a nearby school takes opportunity to molest school students.
8	Round-the-island Serial House-breaking trio / Job Benefit Scam	This episode focuses on: A couple on housebreaking spree.; a job benefit scam
9	Kidnappers Ransom Bid Foiled / Jln Sultan Robbery / Taxi Driver Murder	This episode focuses on: Kidnapping threats of a girl.; Robbery at Jalan Sultan; Appeal from the police of a murdered woman taxi driver.
10	A Look at Traffic Cops	This episode focuses on: Two men threatening people to rob them.; Traffic police in action

=== Season 19 (2005) ===
No.	Title	Description
1	"4-year-old Killed and Burnt / Note-changing"	This episode focuses on: Sundarti Supriyanto, a maid who killed her employer and her 4-year-old daughter; appeal for a cashier scam; behind-the-scenes of Marine Police
2	"DNA Apprehends Molester After 8 Years / Bogus Government Officers"	This episode focuses on: 1996 Ang Mio Kio Ave 3 Murder finally solved with DNA technology; the capture of a jogger who molests young girls; a government impersonation scam which targets the elderly
3	"Serial Rapist / Keep Your Motorcycles Safe"	This episode focuses on: a serial rapist who used a gun to threaten his victims; motorcycle theft; scams targeting the elderly, preying on their belief in superstitions
4	"Murder or Suicide? / Stolen Motorcycle"	This episode focuses on: the murder of Diana Teo Siew Peng; the unsolved murder of taxi driver Lim Choon Fang at Pioneer Sector Walk; a man who falsely reported his motorcycle stolen to cover up a theft he committed
5	"Erimin-5 Abuse / Chap-Ji-Kee Syndicate / Inheritance Scam"	This episode focuses on: Central Narcotics Bureau crackdown on synthetic drug syndicates; handphone theft; an illegal gambling syndicate; an inheritance scam
6	"Masked Gang Assault"	This episode focuses on: a slashing incident; the dangers when teenage girls meet up with strangers they metonline; illegal moneylender debtors turned runners
7	"Couple On Crime Spree / TASER X26 Stun Gun"	This episode focuses on: a couple who robbed students of their mobile phones; the TASER X26 Stun Gun; snatch theft; a case of cheating; the disappearance of Tan Ah Pin
8	"Boon Keng Car Boot Murder / Road Provocation / Online Music Piracy"	This episode focuses on: the murder of Bock Tuan Thong; a road provocation which resulted in the death of a motorcyclist; a police crackdown on online music piracy
9	"Robbery! Or not? / Security Measures Against Terrorism / Serial Molester Nabbed"	This episode focuses on: a staged robbery of a supermarket; security measures against terrorism; a serial molester
10	"Car Export Scam / Serial Taxi Robber Nabbed / Good Traffic Manners"	This episode focuses on: a syndicate which stole cars from car rental companies and exported them overseas to be sold; a serial taxi robber; good traffic manners

=== Season 20 (2006) ===
No.	Title	Description
1	Part 1: Love Affair Turns Sour; Part 2: Suspicious Packages; Part 3: Boon Siew Building Murder	The former Boon Siew Villa This episode focuses on: The arrest of criminals who planned to killed one:a wife due to jealousy; Suspicious packages; Murder at Boon Siew Building
2	Part 1: Terror Of Clementi; Part 2: Victim Care; Part 3: Police Impersonators	This episode focuses on: Rapes in Clementi; Victim care centre in CID; Two people who pretended to be police officers to steal phones from students
3	Part 1: The Constance Chee Story; Part 2: Students Cheated	This episode focuses on: Abduction of Sindee Neo; Students cheated: Police appeal for witness
4	Part 1: Hit-And-Run Solved In 12h Part 2: Forensic Management Branch	This episode focuses on: A dark-hearted taxi driver who ignored and killed a motorist beside his car.; Forensic Management Branch: A look at the operations
5	Part 1: Orchard Road body parts murder Part 2: School Canteen Break-In	This episode focuses on: The murdering of Jane Parangan La Puebla; Theft of criminals stealing food supplies from school canteens
6	Part 1: EZ-Link Card Robbers; Part 2: International Monetary Fund	This episode focuses on: Robbery of EZ-link cards from victims by assaulting; Police prepare for the IMF
7	Part 1: Brutal Sexual Attack; Part 2: Counterfeit Case; Part 3: Outrage Of Modesty	This episode focuses on: A person pretending to be returning an item to house owners to assault them.; Naive teenager arrested for counterfeiting; An elderly Indian janitor targets schoolgirls
8	Part 1: Subutex Abuse; Part 2: Theft Of Brake Calipers; Part 3: Yishun Snatch Thefts	This episode focuses on: Subutex abuse Accused; Criminals stealing brake calipers from motorcycles and selling for illegal money; Snatch thefts targeting the elderlies living in Yishun
9	Part 1: Kallang Body Parts Case; Part 2: Housing Estates Vandalism	This episode focuses on: The murdering of Liu Hong Mei and disposing of the victim and disposing in different places; Housing Estates Vandalism
10	Part 1: Huang Na's Story; Part 2: Operation Grand Hamper	This episode focuses on: A Chinese girl being assaulted by a food Hawker.; The selling of illegal purchased cigarettes.

=== Season 21 (2007) ===
No.	Title	Description
1	Part 1: ATM Skimming; Part 2: High-End Counterfeit Luxury Goods For Sale... Any Takers? Part 3: Public Spiritedness	This episode focuses on: ATM Skimming; High-end counterfeit luxury goods for sale... any takers?; Public-assisted arrests average 4 in every 10 arrests
2	Part 1: Youths On A Rampage; Part 2: Drink Driving – How Much Is Too Much? Part 3: Condos Break-In	This episode focuses on: A group of youths went on a crime rampage before the Police tracked them down; Drink driving - just how much is too much?; busted for a series of house-breaking committed in private apartments
3	Part 1: Underage Sex; Part 2: Robbery Cases Solved In 24h Part 3: Illegal Horse Betting	This episode focuses on: How often do we read about teens with unplanned pregnancies getting into trouble; The elderly has been the targets of criminals and the reported cases are rising; An illegal horse betting syndicate was smashed
4	Part 1: The Big Sleep; Part 2: A Customs-Ary Thing; Part 3: Up Yours!	This episode focuses on: Buys you a drink which then puts you to sleep; what are the prohibited items that cannot be brought into Singapore?; Camcorders, digital cameras and mobile phones with video capabilities help us capture precious moments
5	Part 1: Gone In 45s Part 2: The Hidden Beast	This episode focuses on: Being motorcycles with a larger than average engine capacity; Being overly trusting of strangers may allow yourself to be a victim of crime
6	Part 1: Hell Mailers; Part 2: Dorm-Breakings	This episode focuses on: Unlicensed Moneylending syndicates typically use common tactics like vandalism and threats to deal with bad debtors; Think your valuables are safe in the hostels
7	Part 1: MSN Account Hijacker; Part 2: Armed Robbery; Part 3: Sparkler's Bomb	This episode focuses on: MSN is a convenient way of keeping in touch with friends; armed robberies that happened in lifts; offence to use sparklers or other chemicals to make improvised explosive devices
8	Part 1: Missing Bicycle Racks; Part 2: Bomb Hoax & Wifi Theft; Part 3: Snatch Theft	This episode focuses on: Case of missing bicycle racks; unsecured wireless networks belonging to others without their consent; The elderly are often preys for snatch thefts
9	Part 1: Drugs Importation By Foreign Nationals; Part 2: Divine Master Scam; Part 3: Special Recommendation 9	This episode focuses on: CNB importation of drugs by foreign nationals; Re-emergence of the apple scam fraudsters; Special Recommendation 9 (SR9)
10	Part 1: SecCom; Part 2: '999'; Part 3: Traffic Police Motorcycle Task Force	This episode focuses on: SecCom; Educating the public on when to dial '999'; Traffic Police motorcycle task force

=== Season 22 (2008) ===
No.	Title	Description	Airdate
1	Part 1: Gangster Girls; Part 2: Multi-National Serial Robbers	This episode focuses on: a group of gangster girls video bashing; multi-national serial robbers	
2	Part 1: Private Estate Robberies; Part 2: Pedophile	This episode focuses on: Audacious Serial Robbers in the Private housing Estate area	
3	Part 1: Stealing; Part 2: Snatching; Part 3: House-Breaking	This episode focuses on: two audacious middle east men steal money from 4 shops in a day using the same trick	
4	Part 1: Phone Scams; Part 2: SMS 70999	This episode focuses on:	
5	Part 1: DNA Nabs Serial Molester; Part 2: Operation SOGA	This episode focuses on:	
6	Part 1: Serial Robber Targets Taxi Drivers; Part 2: Ang Mo Kio Knife-Wielding Robber	This episode focuses on:	
7	Part 1: Serial Conman; Part 2: SPF International Peacekeeping Mission	This episode focuses on:	
8	Part 1: DNA Profiling Nabs Insurance Cheat; Part 2: Community Harmony Taskforce; Part 3: Recklessness Kills!	This episode focuses on:	
9	Part 1: Youth Rioters With Dangerous Weapons; Part 2: Police Tactical Unit	This episode focuses on:	
10	Part 1: Serial Snatch Thief Targets Vulnerable Women; Part 2: Safety and Security Watch Group	This episode focuses on:	

=== Season 23 (2009) ===
No.	Title	Description	Airdate
1	Part 1: Murder Case – Nonoi; Part 2: Phone scam – kidnap hoaxes	This episode focuses on:	English – 22 March 2009 (Sunday) – 9 pm Mandarin – 27 March 2009 (Friday) – 8.30 pm Malay – 4 April 2009 (Saturday) – 8.30 pm Tamil – 26 March 2009 (Tuesday) – 8 pm
2	Part 1: A "Couple in disguise" that robbed the elderly Part 2: Appeal for Information – Chong Pang Snatch Theft; Part 3: Drug Mules	This episode focuses on:	English – 26 April 2009 (Sunday) – 9 pm Mandarin – 1 May 2009 (Friday) – 8.30 pm Malay – 4 April 2009 (Saturday) – 8.30 pm Tamil – 26 March 2009 (Thursday) – 8 pm
3	Part 1: Young Molester; Part 2: Party Ends for Serial Pub Burglar	This episode focuses on:	English – 24 May 2009 (Sunday) – 9 pm Mandarin – 29 May 2009 (Friday) – 8.30 pm Malay – 30 May 2009 (Saturday) – 8.30 pm Tamil – 28 May 2009 (Thursday) – 8 pm
4	One-Eyed Dragon	This episode focuses on:	English – 21 June 2009 (Sunday) – 9 pm Mandarin – 26 June 2009 (Friday) – 8.30 pm Malay – 4 July 2009 (Saturday) – 8.30 pm Tamil – 25 June 2009 (Thursday) – 8 pm
5	Part 1: Rental Scam; Part 2: Operation 'Night Painter'	This episode focuses on:	English – 26 July 2009 (Sunday) – 9 pm Mandarin – 31 July 2009 (Friday) – 8.30 pm Malay – 1 August 2009 (Saturday) – 8.30 pm Tamil – 30 July 2009 (Thursday) – 8 pm
6	Part 1: 'Spiderman' Caught! Part 2: Knock! Knock! Blessing for free? Part 3: Pickpocket Syndicates	This episode focuses on:	English – 23 August 2009 (Sunday) – 9 pm Mandarin – 28 August 2009 (Friday) – 8.30 pm Malay – 5 September 2009 (Saturday) – 8.30 pm Tamil – 27 August 2009 (Thursday) – 8 pm
7	Part 1: Netting a violent recalcitrant criminal – Bala Kuppusamy; Part 2: Ride Safe – True story of a motorcycle accident victim	This episode focuses on:	English – 20 September 2009 (Sunday) – 9 pm Mandarin – 25 September 2009 (Friday) – 8.30 pm Malay – 26 September 2009 (Saturday) – 8.30 pm Tamil – 24 September 2009 (Thursday) – 8 pm
8	Part 1: Disgruntled Email Bomb Hoaxer; Part 2: Police preparation for APEC 2009	This episode focuses on:	English – 25 October 2009 (Sunday) – 9 pm Mandarin – 30 October 2009 (Friday) – 8.30 pm Malay – 31 October 2009 (Saturday) – 8.30 pm Tamil – 29 October 2009 (Thursday) – 8 pm
9	Part 1: Protecting our Coastline; Part 2: The Coastal Security Force; Part 3: Trained to be the best	This episode focuses on:	English – 22 November 2009 (Sunday) – 9 pm Mandarin – 27 November 2009 (Friday) – 8.30 pm Malay – 28 November 2009 (Saturday) – 8.30 pm Tamil – 26 November 2009 (Thursday) – 8 pm
10	Part 1: Operation Black Domino – 4-D Syndicate Smashed; Part 2: Neighbourhood Watch in Action; Part 3: Low Crime Does Not Mean No Crime	This episode focuses on:	English – 20 December 2009 (Sunday) – 9 pm Mandarin – 25 December 2009 (Friday) – 8.30 pm Malay – 26 December 2009 (Saturday) – 8.30 pm Tamil – 24 December 2009 (Thursday) – 8 pm

=== Season 24 (2010) ===
No.	Title	Description	Airdate
1	Part 1: Crack down on a Transnational Vehicle Theft Syndicate; Part 2: Debtor turn Loan shark runner	This episode focuses on: Illegal Malaysian cars being smuggled into Malaysia; Educational video showing on declaring illegal items in Singapore	English – 28 March 2010 (Sunday) – 9 pm Mandarin – 26 March 2010 (Friday) – 8.30 pm Malay – 4 April 2010 (Sunday) – 8.30 pm Tamil – 6 April 2010 (Tuesday) – 9 pm
2	Part 1: Murder at Blk 74 Whampoa Drive; Part 2: How Immigration & Checkpoints Authority's (ICA) E-services can help you?	This episode focuses on: Girlfriend convincing boyfriend to murder her ex-husband; ICA arrested a courier for a Malaysian forged card syndicate	English – 25 April 2010 (Sunday) – 9 pm Mandarin – 30 April 2010 (Friday) – 8.30 pm Malay – 1 May 2010 (Saturday) – 8.30 pm Tamil – 27 April 2010 (Tuesday) – 9 pm
3	Part 1: Snatch Theft; Part 2: Illegal Online Soccer Betting; Part 3: Electronic Police Centre (ePC)	This episode focuses on:	English – 23 May 2010 (Sunday) – 9 pm Mandarin – 28 May 2010 (Friday) – 8.30 pm Malay – 29 May 2010 (Saturday) – 8.30 pm Tamil – 25 May 2010 (Tuesday) – 9 pm
4	Part 1: Dead man tells no tales? Part 2: Moving ATM (Taxi Armed Robbery)	This episode focuses on:	English – 11 July 2010 (Sunday)- 9 pm Mandarin – 2 July 2010 (Friday) – 8.30 pm Malay – 24 July 2010 (Saturday) – 8.30 pm Tamil – 21 July 2010 (Wednesday) – 8 pm
5	Part 1: House Breaking and Theft by Night and Day; Part 2: To Declare or not to declare?	This episode focuses on:	English – 25 July 2010 (Sunday) – 9 pm Mandarin – 30 July 2010 (Friday) – 8.30 pm Malay – 31 July 2010 (Saturday) – 8.30 pm Tamil – 27 July 2010 (Tuesday) – 9 pm
6	Part 1: Bogus Photographer; Part 2: Giving Way to Emergency Vehicles	This episode focuses on:	English – 5 September 2010 (Sunday) – 9 pm Mandarin – 27 August 2010 (Friday) – 8.30 pm Malay – 28 August 2010 (Saturday) – 8.30 pm Tamil – 31 August 2010 (Tuesday) – 9 pm
7	Part 1: Free transportation Part 2: Feature on Public Transport Security Command (TransCom); Part 3: Snatch Theft	This episode focuses on:	English – 19 September 2010 (Sunday) – 9 pm Mandarin – 24 September 2010 (Friday) – 8.30 pm Malay – 2 October 2010 (Saturday) – 8.30 pm Tamil – 28 September 2010 (Tuesday) – 9 pm
8	Part 1: Bogus government salesman Part 2: Feature on Safety and Security Watch Groups (SSWGs)	This episode focuses on:	English – 24 October 2010 (Sunday) – 9 pm Mandarin – 29 October 2010 (Friday) – 8.30 pm Malay – 30 October 2010 (Saturday) – 8.30 pm Tamil – 26 October 2010 (Tuesday) – 9 pm
9	Part 1: Serial House Breaker; Part 2: Serial Molester	This episode focuses on:	English – 21 November 2010 (Sunday) – 9 pm Mandarin – 26 November 2010 (Friday) – 8.30 pm Malay – 27 November 2010 (Saturday) – 8.30 pm Tamil – 30 November 2010 (Tuesday) – 9 pm
10	Part 1: Cyber Love Trap; Part 2: Lottery Scam	This episode focuses on:	English – 19 December 2010 (Sunday) – 9 pm Mandarin – 31 December 2010 (Friday) – 8.30 pm Malay – 1 January 2011 (Saturday) – 8.30 pm Tamil – 28 December 2010 (Tuesday) – 9 pm

=== Season 25 (2011) ===
No.	Title	Description	Airdate
1	Part 1: Indian sex worker murdered at Geylang hotel Part 2: Wipe-out vice activities	This episode focuses on:	English – 27 March 2011 (Sunday) – 9 pm Mandarin – 25 March 2011 (Friday) – 8.30 pm Malay – 2 April 2011 (Saturday) – 8.30 pm Tamil – 29 March 2011 (Tuesday) – 9 pm
2	Part 1: Murder of a Male Massage Operator; Part 2: Appeal for information (Murder at Marina Boulevard)	This episode focuses on:	English – 15 May 2011 (Sunday) – 9 pm Mandarin – 29 April 2011 (Friday) – 8.30 pm Malay – 30 April 2011 (Saturday) – 8.30 pm Tamil – 26 April 2011 (Tuesday) – 9 pm
3	Part 1: Serial Carjacker Nabbed; Part 2: A Fresh Start	This episode focuses on:	English – 29 May 2011 (Sunday) – 9 pm Mandarin – 3 June 2011 (Friday) – 8.30 pm Malay – 4 June 2011 (Saturday) – 8.30 pm Tamil – 31 May 2011 (Tuesday) – 9 pm
4	Part 1: iPhone Scam; Part 2: Theft of iPhone; Part 3: Find My Phone Application	This episode focuses on:	English – 26 June 2011 (Sunday) – 9 pm Mandarin – 1 July 2011 (Friday) – 8.30 pm Malay – 2 July 2011 (Saturday) – 8.30 pm Tamil – 28 June 2011 (Tuesday) – 9 pm
5	Part 1: A Human Trafficking Syndicate Brought Down; Part 2: Counterfeit Notes	This episode focuses on:	English – 24 July 2011 (Sunday) – 9 pm Mandarin – 29 July 2011 (Friday) – 8.30 pm Malay – 31 July 2011 (Sunday) – 7 pm Tamil – 26 July 2011 (Tuesday) – 9 pm
6	Part 1: How the Police tracked down the Woodlands door step molester Part 2: House-breaking	This episode focuses on:	English – 28 August 2011 (Sunday) – 9 pm Mandarin – 2 September 2011 (Friday) – 8.30 pm Malay – 10 September 2011 (Saturday) – 8.30 pm Tamil – 30 August 2011 (Tuesday) – 9 pm
7	Part 1: The Convenience Store Teenaged Armed Robbers; Part 2: Unlicensed Moneylender	This episode focuses on:	English – 18 September 2011 (Sunday) – 9 pm Mandarin – 30 September 2011 (Friday) – 8.30 pm Malay – 1 October 2011 (Saturday) – 8.30 pm Tamil – 20 September 2011 (Tuesday) – 9 pm
8	Part 1: The Theft Of $500,000 Worth Of Gold; Part 2: Spike And Steal	This episode focuses on:	English – 23 October 2011 (Sunday) – 9 pm Mandarin – 28 October 2011 (Friday) – 8.30 pm Malay – 29 October 2011 (Saturday) – 8.30 pm Tamil – 1 November 2011 (Tuesday) – 9 pm
9	Part 1: How A Small Misunderstanding Led To A Gang Fight; Part 2: Easy money Part 3: Holiday programmes for Youths	This episode focuses on:	English – 27 November 2011 (Sunday) – 9 pm Mandarin – 25 November 2011 (Friday) – 8.30 pm Malay – 3 December 2011 (Saturday) – 8.30 pm Tamil – 29 November 2011 (Tuesday) – 9 pm
10	Part 1: A Million Dollars' Worth Of Branded Cosmetic Products Stolen! Part 2: Kidnap Scam	This episode focuses on:	English – 18 December 2011 (Sunday) – 9 pm Mandarin – 23 December 2011 (Friday) – 8.30 pm Malay – 17 December 2011 (Saturday) – 8.30 pm Tamil – 20 December 2011 (Tuesday) – 9 pm
Special Episode	Crimewatch 25th Anniversary Special	This episode focuses on:	29 January 2012 (Sunday) – 8.30 pm

=== Season 26 (2012) ===
No.	Title	Description	Airdate
1	Part 1: Robbery-Cum-Murder Case; Part 2: Appeal for Information	This episode focuses on: The murder of Thein Naing due to robbery and murder by three killers, together with a fourth man who acted as a lookout.	English – 25 March 2012 (Sunday) – 9 pm Mandarin – 30 March 2012 (Friday) – 8:30 pm Malay – 5 April 2012 (Thursday) – 8:30 pm Tamil – 4 April 2012 (Wednesday) – 9:30 pm
2	Part 1: Serial Snatch Thief; Part 2: Bicycle Theft	This episode focuses on:	English – 29 April 2012 (Sunday) – 9 pm Mandarin – 4 May 2012 (Friday) – 8:30 pm Malay – 3 May 2012 (Thursday) – 8:30 pm Tamil – 2 May 2012 (Wednesday) – 9:30 pm
3	Part 1: Sex drugs Part 2: Illegal Sex Drugs Activities Arrestment; Part 3: Female hugger that target elderly men	This episode focuses on:	English – 3 June 2012 (Sunday) – 9 pm Mandarin – 1 June 2012 (Friday) – 8.30 pm Malay – 7 June 2012 (Thursday) – 8.30 pm Tamil – 30 May 2012 (Wednesday) – 9.30 pm
4	Part 1: Extortion From An Internet Chat Session; Part 2: Scratch & Win Scam in JB; Part 3: Game Credit Scam & Great Singapore Sale Advisory 2012	This episode focuses on:	English – 24 June 2012 (Sunday) – 9 pm Mandarin – 29 June 2012 (Friday) – 8.30 pm Malay – 28 June 2012 (Thursday) – 8.30 pm Tamil – 27 June 2012 (Wednesday) – 9.30 pm
5	Part 1: Unlicensed Moneylender; Part 2: Road Safety Advisory	This episode focuses on:	English – 22 July 2012 (Sunday) – 9 pm Mandarin – 27 July 2012 (Friday) – 8.30 pm Malay – 26 July 2012 (Thursday) – 8.30 pm Tamil – 25 July 2012 (Wednesday) – 9.30 pm
6	Armed Robbery With Foreign Recruitment	This episode focuses on:	English – 9 September 2012 (Sunday) – 9 pm Mandarin – 31 August 2012 (Friday) – 8.30 pm Malay – 30 August 2012 (Thursday) – 8.30 pm Tamil – 29 August 2012 (Wednesday) – 9.30 pm
7	A Brutal Murder	This episode focuses on:	English – 30 September 2012 (Sunday) – 9 pm Mandarin – 5 October 2012 (Friday) – 8.30 pm Malay – 4 October 2012 (Thursday) – 8.30 pm Tamil – 3 October 2012 (Wednesday) – 9.30 pm
8	Part 1: An Employment Agency Running Employment Scams; Part 2: Traffic Awareness	This episode focuses on:	English – 28 October 2012 (Sunday) – 9 pm Mandarin – 2 November 2012 (Friday) – 8.30 pm Malay – 1 November 2012 (Thursday) – 8.30 pm Tamil – 31 October 2012 (Wednesday) – 9.30 pm
9	Part 1: House Break-in and Theft done by Colombians; Part 2: Appeal for information	This episode focuses on:	English – 25 November 2012 (Sunday) at 9 pm Mandarin – 30 November 2012 (Friday) at 8.30 pm Malay – 29 November 2012 (Thursday) at 8.30 pm Tamil – 28 November 2012 (Wednesday) at 9.30 pm
10	Part 1: A Deadly Combination Of Alcohol And Driving; Part 2: Crime prevention tips on this Holiday Season	This episode focuses on:	English – 23 December 2012 (Sunday) – 9 pm Mandarin – 28 December 2012 (Friday) – 8:30 pm Malay – 3 January 2013 (Thursday) – 8:30 pm Tamil – 2 January 2013 (Wednesday) – 9:30 pm

=== Season 27 (2013) ===
No.	Title	Description	Airdate
1	Dead man talking	This episode focuses on:	English – 24 March 2013 (Sunday) – 9 pm Mandarin – 29 March 2013 (Friday) – 8.30 pm Malay – 4 April 2013 (Thursday) – 8.30 pm Tamil – 7 April 2013 (Sunday) – 8 pm
2	Part 1: Cold-blooded Robbery; Part 2: Community Policing System (COPS)	This episode focuses on:	English – 28 April 2013 (Sunday) – 9 pm Mandarin – 3 May 2013 (Friday) – 8:30 pm Malay – 2 May 2013 (Thursday) – 8:30 pm Tamil – 5 May 2013 (Sunday) – 8 pm
3	Part 1: Gang Clash; Part 2: Crime Prevention Advisory on Great Singapore Sale	This episode focuses on:	English – 26 May 2013 (Sunday) – 9 pm Mandarin – 31 May 2013 (Friday) – 8.30 pm Malay – 30 May 2013 (Thursday) – 8.30 pm Tamil – 2 June 2013 (Sunday) – 8 pm
4	Part 1: Online Sex Scam; Part 2: ICA Scam	This episode focuses on:	English – 30 June 2013 (Sunday) – 9 pm Mandarin – 5 July 2013 (Friday) – 8.30 pm Malay – 11 July 2013 (Thursday) – 8.30 pm Tamil – 14 July 2013 (Sunday) – 8 pm
5	Part 1: Armed Robbery; Part 2: Road Safety Advisory	This episode focuses on:	English – 21 July 2013 (Sunday) – 9 pm Mandarin – 26 July 2013 (Friday) – 8.30 pm Malay – 25 July 2013 (Thursday) – 8.30 pm Tamil – 4 August 2013 (Sunday) – 8 pm
6	Human Trafficking into Prostitution	This episode focuses on:	English – 1 September 2013 (Sunday) – 9 pm Mandarin – 6 September 2013 (Friday) – 8.30 pm Malay – 5 September 2013 (Thursday) – 8.30 pm Tamil – 8 September 2013 (Sunday) – 8 pm
7	Gold Ingots Scam by PRCs	This episode focuses on:	English – 29 September 2013 (Sunday) – 9 pm Mandarin – 4 October 2013 (Friday) – 8.30 pm Malay – 3 October 2013 (Thursday) – 8.30 pm Tamil – 6 October 2013 (Sunday) – 8 pm
8	Part 1: Mystery Abandoned Car with Drugs; Part 2: Institute of Mental Health	This episode focuses on:	English – 27 October 2013 (Sunday) – 9 pm Mandarin – 1 November 2013 (Friday) – 8.30 pm Malay – 31 October 2013 (Thursday) – 8.30 pm Tamil – 10 November 2013 (Sunday) – 8 pm
9	Part 1: Money Mules; Part 2: Road Advisory for Motorcyclist	This episode focuses on:	English – 24 November 2013 (Sunday) – 9 pm Mandarin – 29 November 2013 (Friday) – 8.30 pm Malay – 28 November 2013 (Thursday) – 8.30 pm Tamil – 1 December 2013 (Sunday) – 8 pm
10	Part 1: House-breaking and Theft; Part 2: Crime Prevention Advisory on HBT; Part 3: Year-End Festive Advisory	This episode focuses on:	English – 29 December 2013 (Sunday) – 9 pm Mandarin – 3 January 2014 (Friday) – 8.30 pm Malay – 2 January 2014 (Thursday) – 8.30 pm Tamil – 5 January 2014 (Sunday) – 8 pm

=== Season 28 (2014) ===
No.	Title	Description	Airdate
1	Rob-On-Delivery	This episode focuses on:	English – 23 March 2014 (Sunday) – 9 pm Mandarin – 28 March 2014 (Friday) – 8.30 pm Malay – 3 April 2014 (Thursday) – 8.30 pm Tamil – 30 March 2014 (Sunday)- 8 pm
2	"Ah Long" Scam	This episode focuses on:	English – 27 April 2014 (Sunday) – 9pm Mandarin – 2 May 2014 (Friday) – 8.30pm Malay – 1 May 2014 (Thursday) – 8.30pm Tamil – 4 May 2014 (Sunday) – 8pm
3	Part 1: Online Soccer Betting; Part 2: Crime Prevention Advisory on the Great Singapore Sale	This episode focuses on:	English – 25 May 2014 (Sunday) – 9pm Mandarin – 30 May 2014 (Friday) – 8.30pm Malay – 29 May 2014 (Thursday) – 8.30pm Tamil – 1 June 2014 (Sunday) – 8pm
4	Theft On-board Aircraft	This episode focuses on:	English – 29 June 2014 (Sunday) – 9pm Mandarin – 4 July 2014 (Friday) – 8.30pm Malay – 3 July 2014 (Thursday) – 8.30pm Tamil – 6 July 2014 (Sunday) – 8pm
5	Sextortion	This episode focuses on:	English – 20 July 2014 (Sunday) – 9pm Mandarin – 25 July 2014 (Friday) – 8:30pm Malay – 31 July 2014 (Thursday) – 8:30pm Tamil – 3 August 2014 (Sunday) – 8pm
6	Part 1: Online Purchase Scam; Part 2: Stolen and Lost Property Index	This episode focuses on:	English – 31 August 2014 (Sunday) – 9pm Mandarin – 5 September 2014 (Friday) – 8:30pm Malay – 4 September 2014 (Thursday) – 8:30pm Tamil – 7 September 2014 (Sunday) – 8pm
7	Cyber Crimes	This episode focuses on:	English – 28 September 2014 (Sunday) – 9pm Mandarin – 3 October 2014 (Friday) – 8:30pm Malay – 2 October 2014 (Thursday) – 8:30pm Tamil – 12 October 2014 (Sunday) – 8pm
8	Charity Scams	This episode focuses on:	English – 26 October 2014 (Sunday) – 9pm Mandarin – 31 October 2014 (Friday) – 8:30pm Malay – 30 October 2014 (Thursday) – 8:30pm Tamil – 2 November 2014 (Sunday) – 8pm
9	Part 1: Gang Clash; Part 2: Year End Advisory Safety	This episode focuses on:	English – 30 November 2014 (Sunday) – 9pm Mandarin – 5 December 2014 (Friday) – 8.30pm Malay – 4 December 2014 (Thursday) – 8.30pm Tamil – 14 December 2014 (Sunday) – 8pm
10	Part 1: Housebreaking by PRCs; Part 2: Crime Prevention Advisory on HBT	This episode focuses on:	English – 28 December 2014 (Sunday) – 9pm Mandarin – 2 January 2015 (Friday) – 8.30pm Malay – 8 January 2015 (Thursday) – 8.30pm Tamil – 4 January 2015 (Sunday) – 8pm

=== Season 29 (2015) ===
No.	Title	Description	Airdate
1	Extortion	This episode focuses on:	English – 22 March 2015 (Sunday) – 9.00 pm Mandarin – 3 April 2015 (Friday) – 8.30 pm (due to the week of the passing of Lee Kuan Yew); Malay – 1 April 2015 (Wednesday) – 8.30 pm Tamil – 5 April 2015 (Sunday) – 8.00 pm
2	Operation Primordial	This episode focuses on:	English – 3 May 2015 (Sunday) – 9.00 pm Mandarin – 1 May 2015 (Friday) – 8.30 pm Malay – 6 May 2015 (Wednesday) – 8.30 pm Tamil – 10 May 2015 (Sunday) – 8.00 pm
3	Part 1: Curry Powder Robbery; Part 2: Crime Prevention Advisory on the Great Singapore Sale	This episode focuses on: The robbery of the Head of migrant worker during paycheck month with curry powder.	English – 31 May 2015 (Sunday) – 9.00 pm Mandarin – 5 June 2015 (Friday) – 8.30 pm Malay – 10 June 2015 (Wednesday) – 8.30 pm Tamil – 14 June 2015 (Sunday) – 8.00 pm
4	Yishun Triple Murder	This episode focuses on: A Chinese guy who murdered his tenants, including his spoilt girlfriend and her daughter.	English – 28 June 2015 (Sunday) – 9.00 pm Mandarin – 3 July 2015 (Friday) – 8.30 pm Malay – 8 July 2015 (Wednesday) – 8.30 pm Tamil – 12 July 2015 (Sunday) – 8.00 pm
5	Theft of Marine Gas Oil	This episode focuses on:	English – 26 July 2015 (Sunday) – 8.30 pm Mandarin – 31 July 2015 (Friday) – 8.30 pm Malay – 5 August 2015 (Wednesday) – 8.30 pm Tamil – 16 August 2015 (Sunday) – 8.00 pm
6	Part 1: Theft from motor-vehicle Part 2: Alipay scam	This episode focuses on:	English – 30 August 2015 (Sunday) – 8.30 pm Mandarin – 4 September 2015 (Friday) – 8.30 pm Malay – 9 September 2015 (Wednesday) – 8.30 pm Tamil – 13 September 2015 (Sunday) – 8.00 pm
7	Case of Snatch Theft and Robbery	This episode focuses on:	English – 20 September 2015 (Sunday) – 8.30 pm Mandarin – 2 October 2015 (Friday) – 8.30 pm Malay – 7 October 2015 (Wednesday) – 8.30 pm Tamil – 11 October 2015 (Sunday) – 8.00 pm
8	Love Scam	This episode focuses on: Online scam	English – 25 October 2015 (Sunday) – 8.30 pm Mandarin – 30 October 2015 (Friday) – 8.30 pm Malay – 4 November 2015 (Wednesday) – 8.30 pm Tamil – 15 November 2015 (Sunday) – 8.00 pm
9	Part 1: House-Breaking and Theft Part 2: Year-end Festive Advisory	This episode focuses on:	English – 22 November 2015 (Sunday) – 8.30 pm Mandarin – 27 November 2015 (Friday) – 8.30 pm Malay – 4 December 2015 (Friday) – 8.30 pm Tamil – 6 December 2015 (Sunday) – 8.00 pm
10	2013 Singapore cyberattacks	This episode focuses on: An foreign hacked who had hacked websites in Singapore to spread threads	English – 20 December 2015 (Sunday) – 8.30 pm Mandarin – 25 December 2015 (Friday) – 8.30 pm Malay – 30 December 2015 (Wednesday) – 8.30 pm Tamil – 3 January 2016 (Sunday) – 8.00 pm

=== Season 30 (2016) ===
No.	Title	Description	Airdate
1	Part 1: Gang Robbery Part 2: New Police Identification Cards	This episode focuses on:	English – 27 March 2016 (Sunday) – 8.30 pm Mandarin – 1 April 2016 (Friday) – 8.30 pm Malay – 6 April 2016 (Wednesday) – 8.30 pm Tamil – 7 April 2016 (Thursday) – 8.00 pm
2	"Credit-For-Sex" Scam	This episode focuses on:	English – 24 April 2016 (Sunday) – 8.30 pm Mandarin – 29 April 2016 (Friday) – 8.30 pm Malay – 4 May 2016 (Wednesday) – 8.30 pm Tamil – 5 May 2016 (Thursday) – 8.00 pm
3	Part 1: Adulterated Alcohol Part 2: Illegal Soccer Betting Advisory	This episode focuses on:	English – 29 May 2016 (Sunday) – 8.30 pm Mandarin – 27 May 2016 (Friday) – 8.30 pm Malay – 1 June 2016 (Wednesday) – 8.30 pm Tamil – 2 June 2016 (Thursday) – 8.00 pm
4	Part 1: Murder at McNair Road Part 2: Crime Prevention Advisory on the Great Singapore Sale	This episode focuses on:	English – 26 June 2016 (Sunday) – 8.30 pm Mandarin – 24 June 2016 (Friday) – 8.30 pm Malay – 29 June 2016 (Wednesday) – 8.30 pm Tamil – 7 July 2016 (Thursday) – 8.00 pm
5	Part 1: Money-mule Part 2: Cyber Terror	This episode focuses on:	English – 24 July 2016 (Sunday) – 8:30 pm Mandarin – 29 July 2016 (Friday) – 8.30 pm Malay – 3 August 2016 (Wednesday) – 8.30 pm Tamil – 4 August 2016 (Thursday) – 8.00 pm
6	Human Trafficking	This episode focuses on:	English – 28 August 2016 (Sunday) – 8:30 pm Mandarin – 26 August 2016 (Friday) – 8.30 pm Malay – 31 August 2016 (Wednesday) – 8.30 pm Tamil – 1 September 2016 (Thursday) – 8.00 pm
7	Part 1: Snatch Theft Part 2: Crime Prevention Advisory on renting your flats	This episode focuses on:	English – 2 October 2016 (Sunday) – 8.30 pm Mandarin – 30 September 2016 (Friday) – 8.30 pm Malay – 5 October 2016 (Wednesday) – 8.30 pm Tamil – 6 October 2016 (Thursday) – 8.00 pm
8	Operation Trident	This episode focuses on:	English – 30 October 2016 (Sunday) – 8.30 pm Mandarin – 28 October 2016 (Friday) – 8.30 pm Malay – 2 November 2016 (Wednesday) – 8.30 pm Tamil – 3 November 2016 (Thursday) – 8.00 pm
9	UK Prime Land Pte Ltd	This episode focuses on:	English – 20 November 2016 (Sunday) – 8.30 pm Mandarin – 25 November 2016 (Friday) – 8.30 pm Malay – 30 November 2016 (Wednesday) – 8.30 pm Tamil – 1 December 2016 (Thursday) – 8.00 pm
10	Part 1: Computer Hacking and Illegal Online Purchase Part 2: Youth Gang	This episode focuses on:	English – 18 December 2016 (Sunday) – 8.30 pm Mandarin – 30 December 2016 (Friday) – 8.30 pm Malay – 4 January 2017 (Wednesday) – 8.30 pm Tamil – 5 January 2017 (Thursday) – 8.00 pm

=== Season 31 (2017) ===
No.	Title	Description	Airdate
1	Part 1: Gang Robbery Part 2: Electronic Police Centre	This episode focuses on: Impersonating as Police officers and through meticulous planning and robbing the Money Changer and got away with $1,000,000	English – 26 March 2017 (Sunday) – 8.30 pm Mandarin – 31 March 2017 (Friday) – 8.30 pm Malay – 5 April 2017 (Wednesday) – 9.00 pm Tamil – 6 April 2017 (Thursday) – 8.00 pm
2	Part 1: Cheating Scam Part 2: Game Credit Scam	This episode focuses on:	English – 23 April 2017 (Sunday) – 8.30 pm Mandarin – 28 April 2017 (Friday) – 8.00 pm Malay – 3 May 2017 (Wednesday) – 9.00 pm Tamil – 4 May 2017 (Thursday) – 8.00 pm
3	Part 1: Robbing Foreign Sex Workers Part 2: Feature on Airport Police Division	This episode focuses on:	English – 21 May 2017 (Sunday) – 8.30 pm Mandarin – 26 May 2017 (Friday) – 8.00 pm Malay – 31 May 2017 (Wednesday) – 9.00 pm Tamil – 8 June 2017 (Thursday) – 8.00 pm
4	Part 1: Outrage of Modesty Part 2: Crime Prevention Advisory on the Great Singapore Sale	This episode focuses on:	English – 18 June 2017 (Sunday) – 8.30 pm Mandarin – 30 June 2017 (Friday) – 8.00 pm Malay – 5 July 2017 (Wednesday) – 9.00 pm Tamil – 6 July 2017 (Thursday) – 8.00 pm
5	Illegal Moneylending Activities	This episode focuses on:	English – 23 July 2017 (Sunday) – 8.30 pm Mandarin – 28 July 2017 (Friday) – 8.00 pm Malay – 2 August 2017 (Wednesday) – 9.00 pm Tamil – 3 August 2017 (Thursday) – 8.00 pm
6	Police Impersonation Phone Scam	This episode focuses on:	English – 27 August 2017 (Sunday) – 8.30 pm Mandarin – 25 August 2017 (Friday) – 8.00 pm Malay – 4 September 2017 (Wednesday) – 9.00 pm Tamil – 5 September 2017 (Thursday) – 8.00 pm
7	Theft From ATM	This episode focuses on:	English – 24 September 2017 (Sunday) – 8.30 pm Mandarin – 29 September 2017 (Friday) – 8.00 pm Malay – 4 October 2017 (Wednesday) – 9.00 pm Tamil – 5 October 2017 (Thursday) – 8.00 pm
8	Part 1: Tax Evasion Part 2: Misuse of Boarding Pass	This episode focuses on:	English – 22 October 2017 (Sunday) – 8.30 pm Mandarin – 27 October 2017 (Friday) – 8.00 pm Malay – 1 November 2017 (Wednesday) – 9.00 pm Tamil – 2 November 2017 (Thursday) – 8.00 pm
9	Part 1: House Trespass and Attempted Robbery Part 2: Online Fundraising Appeals	This episode focuses on:	English – 19 November 2017 (Sunday) – 8.30 pm Mandarin – 24 November 2017 (Friday) – 8.00 pm Malay – 29 November 2017 (Wednesday) – 9.00 pm Tamil – 7 December 2017 (Thursday) – 8.00 pm
10	Cheating at Play	This episode focuses on:	English – 17 December 2017 (Sunday) – 8.30 pm Mandarin – 29 December 2017 (Friday) – 8.00 pm Malay – 3 January 2018 (Wednesday) – 9.00 pm Tamil – 4 January 2018 (Thursday) – 8.00 pm

=== Season 32 (2018) ===
No.	Title	Description	Airdate
1	Part 1: Legless body in suitcase Part 2: Chinese Officials Impersonation Scam	This episode focuses on: The murder of an Indian guy due to greed and jealousy; China Officials Impersonation Scam	English – 25 March 2018 (Sunday) – 8.30 pm Mandarin – 23 March 2018 (Friday) – 8.00 pm Malay – 4 April 2018 (Wednesday) – 8.30 pm Tamil – 29 March 2018 (Thursday) – 8.00 pm
2	Part 1: HDB Vice Activities Part 2: Fraudulent Purchase Scam Charged to Mobile Phone Bill	This episode focuses on: Secrecy Proptitution; Activity in HDB flats.	English – 22 April 2018 (Sunday) – 8.30 pm Mandarin – 27 April 2018 (Friday) – 8.00 pm Malay – 2 May 2018 (Wednesday) – 8.30 pm Tamil – 3 May 2018 (Thursday) – 8.00 pm
3	Part 1: Serial Snatch Theft Part 2: Online Credit Card Phishing Scam	This episode focuses on: The suspect targeting the elderly who are vulnerable in crime.	English – 20 May 2018 (Sunday) – 8.30 pm Mandarin – 25 May 2018 (Friday) – 8.00 pm Malay – 30 May 2018 (Wednesday) – 9.00 pm Tamil – 31 May 2018 (Thursday) – 8.00 pm
4	Part 1: Voluntarily Causing Grievous Hurt Part 2: Crime Prevention Advisory on the Great Singapore Sale	This episode focuses on: A supposedly fun night out with friends went wrong as the victim fell into his death by a suspect.	English – 24 June 2018 (Sunday) – 8.30 pm Mandarin – 29 June 2018 (Friday) – 8.00 pm Malay – 4 July 2018 (Wednesday) – 9.00 pm Tamil – 5 July 2018 (Thursday) – 8.00 pm
5	Trafficking, Possession and Consumption of Controlled Drugs	This episode focuses on:	English – 22 July 2018 (Sunday) – 8.30 pm Mandarin – 27 July 2018 (Friday) – 8.00 pm Malay – 1 August 2018 (Wednesday) – 9.00 pm Tamil – 5 August 2018 (Sunday) – 8.00 pm
6	Money Mule Arrested Through Extensive Investigations	This episode focuses on:	English – 26 August 2018 (Sunday) – 8.30 pm Mandarin – 31 August 2018 (Friday) – 8.00 pm Malay – 5 September 2018 (Wednesday) – 9.00 pm Tamil – 9 September 2018 (Sunday) – 8.00 pm
7	Theft by group of Chileans	This episode focuses on: Foreigners tourist setting up traps to rob Singaporeans	English – 23 September 2018 (Sunday) – 8.30 pm Mandarin – 28 September 2018 (Friday) – 8.00 pm Malay – 3 October 2018 (Wednesday) – 9.00 pm Tamil – 7 October 2018 (Sunday) – 8.00 pm
8	Cybercrime	This episode focuses on:	English – 21 October 2018 (Sunday) – 8.30 pm Mandarin – 26 October 2018 (Friday) – 8.00 pm Malay – 31 October 2018 (Wednesday) – 9.00 pm Tamil – 4 November 2018 (Sunday) – 9.00 pm
9	Part 1: A Series of Burglaries Part 2: Crime prevention tips on this Holiday Season	This episode focuses on:	English – 25 November 2018 (Sunday) – 8.30 pm Mandarin – 30 November 2018 (Friday) – 8.00 pm Malay – 5 December 2018 (Wednesday) – 9.00 pm Tamil – 9 December 2018 (Sunday) – 9.00 pm
10	Part 1: Western Union Robbery Part 2: Police Professionalism and Public Education	This episode focuses on:	English – 23 December 2018 (Sunday) – 8.30 pm Mandarin – 28 December 2018 (Friday) – 8.00 pm Malay – 2 January 2019 (Wednesday) – 9.00 pm Tamil – 6 January 2019 (Sunday) – 9.00 pm

=== Season 33 (2019) ===
No.	Title	Description	Airdate
1	Choa Chu Kang Combined Temple murder	This episode focuses on: The murder and Robbery of a Temple nightwatcher.	English – 24 March 2019 (Sunday) – 8.30 pm Mandarin – 29 March 2019 (Friday) – 8.00 pm Malay – 3 April 2019 (Wednesday) – 9.00 pm Tamil – 5 April 2019 (Friday) – 9.00 pm
2	Cybercrime	This episode focuses on:	English – 21 April 2019 (Sunday) – 8.30 pm Mandarin – 26 April 2019 (Friday) – 8.00 pm Malay – 1 May 2019 (Wednesday) – 9.00 pm Tamil – 3 May 2019 (Friday) – 9.00 pm
3	Part 1: Illegal Racing; Part 2: Hit & Run	This episode focuses on:	English – 26 May 2019 (Sunday) – 8.30 pm Mandarin – 31 May 2019 (Friday) – 8.00 pm Malay – 5 June 2019 (Wednesday) – 9.00 pm Tamil – 7 June 2019 (Friday) – 9.00 pm
4	Housebreaking by night	This episode focuses on:	English – 23 June 2019 (Sunday) – 8.30 pm Mandarin – 28 June 2019 (Friday) – 8.00 pm Malay – 3 July 2019 (Wednesday) – 9.00 pm Tamil – 5 July 2019 (Friday) – 9.00 pm
5	Theft in Dwelling	This episode focuses on:	English – 21 July 2019 (Sunday) – 8.30 pm Mandarin – 26 July 2019 (Friday) – 8.00 pm Malay – 31 July 2019 (Wednesday) – 9.00 pm Tamil – 2 August 2019 (Friday) – 8.00 pm
6	Transnational Cheating Case	This episode focuses on:	English – 25 August 2019 (Sunday) – 8.30 pm Mandarin – 30 August 2019 (Friday) – 8.00 pm Malay – 4 September 2019 (Wednesday) – 9.00 pm Tamil – 6 September 2019 (Friday) – 9.00 pm
7	Loanshark Harassment	This episode focuses on:	English – 29 September 2019 (Sunday) – 8.30 pm Mandarin – 27 September 2019 (Friday) – 8.00 pm Malay – 2 October 2019 (Wednesday) – 9.00 pm Tamil – 4 October 2019 (Friday) – 9.00 pm
8	Online Prostitution	This episode focuses on:	English – 20 October 2019 (Sunday) – 8.30 pm Mandarin – 25 October 2019 (Friday) – 8.00 pm Malay – 30 October 2019 (Wednesday) – 9.00 pm Tamil – 1 November 2019 (Friday) – 9.00 pm
9	Robbery	This episode focuses on:	English – 24 November 2019 (Sunday) – 8.30 pm Mandarin – 29 November 2019 (Friday) – 8.00 pm Malay – 4 November 2019 (Wednesday) – 9.00 pm Tamil – 6 December 2019 (Friday) – 8.00 pm
10	Police Impersonation Scam	This episode focuses on:	English – 22 December 2019 (Sunday) – 8.30 pm Mandarin – 27 December 2019 (Friday) – 8.00 pm Malay – 1 January 2020 (Wednesday) – 9.00 pm Tamil – 3 January 2020 (Friday) – 9.00 pm

=== Season 34 (2020) ===
No.	Title	Description	Airdate
1	Attempted Armed Robbery	This episode focuses on:	English – 22 March 2020 (Sunday) – 8.30 pm Mandarin – 27 March 2020 (Friday) – 8.00 pm Malay – 1 April 2020 (Wednesday) – 9.00 pm Tamil – 3 April 2020 (Friday) – 9.00 pm
2	Rioting	This episode focuses on:	English – 19 April 2020 (Sunday) – 8.30 pm Mandarin – 24 April 2020 (Friday) – 8.00 pm Malay – 6 May 2020 (Wednesday) – 9.00 pm Tamil – 1 May 2020 (Friday) – 9.00 pm
3	Housebreaking and Theft by night	This episode focuses on:	English – 26 July 2020 (Sunday) – 8.30 pm Mandarin – 31 July 2020 (Friday) – 8.00 pm Malay – 12 August 2020 (Wednesday) – 9.00 pm Tamil – 7 August 2020 (Friday) – 9.00 pm
4	E-Commerce Scam	This episode focuses on:	English – 16 August 2020 (Sunday) – 8.30 pm Mandarin – 28 August 2020 (Friday) – 8.00 pm Malay – 2 September 2020 (Wednesday) – 9.00 pm Tamil – 4 September 2020 (Friday) – 9.00 pm
5	Gardens by the Bay murder (Missing And Murdered)	This episode focuses on:	English – 20 September 2020 (Sunday) – 8.30 pm Mandarin – 25 September 2020 (Friday) – 8.00 pm Malay – 7 October 2020 (Wednesday) – 9.00 pm Tamil – 2 October 2020 (Friday) – 9.00 pm
6	Theft of Motor Vehicle and Theft from Motor Vehicle	This episode focuses on:	English – 25 October 2020 (Sunday) – 8.30 pm Mandarin – 30 October 2020 (Friday) – 8.00 pm Malay – 4 November 2020 (Wednesday) – 9.00 pm Tamil – 6 November 2020 (Friday) – 9.00 pm
7	Online Vice	This episode focuses on:	English – 22 November 2020 (Sunday) – 8.30 pm Mandarin – 27 November 2020 (Friday) – 8.00 pm Malay – 2 December 2020 (Wednesday) – 9.00 pm Tamil – 4 December 2020 (Friday) – 8.00 pm
8	Armed Robbery	This episode focuses on:	English – 20 December 2020 (Sunday) – 8.30 pm Mandarin – 25 December 2020 (Friday) – 8.00 pm Malay – 6 January 2021 (Wednesday) – 9.00 pm Tamil – 1 January 2021 (Friday) – 9.00 pm
9	Loanshark Harassment	This episode focuses on:	English – 24 January 2021 (Sunday) – 8.30 pm Mandarin – 29 January 2021 (Friday) – 8.00 pm Malay – 3 February 2021 (Wednesday) – 9.00 pm Tamil – 5 February 2021 (Friday) – 9.00 pm
10	Cheating a victim of more than $170,000 in a single transaction	This episode focuses on:	English – 21 February 2021 (Sunday) – 8.30 pm Mandarin – 5 March 2021 (Friday) – 8.00 pm Malay – 3 March 2021 (Wednesday) – 9.00 pm Tamil – 5 March 2021 (Friday) – 9.00 pm

=== Season 35 (2021) ===
No.	Title	Description	Airdate
1	Ferry Terminal Murder	This episode focuses on: The murder of a cleaner due to rage and the need of cash.	English – 25 April 2021 (Sunday) – 8.30 pm Mandarin – 30 April 2021 (Friday) – 8.00 pm Malay – 5 May 2021 (Wednesday) – 9.00 pm Tamil – 7 May 2021 (Friday) – 9.30 pm
2	Housebreaking and Theft by Night	This episode focuses on:	English – 23 May 2021 (Sunday) – 8.30 pm Mandarin – 28 May 2021 (Friday) – 8.00 pm Malay – 2 June 2021 (Wednesday) – 9.00 pm Tamil – 4 June 2021 (Friday) – 9.30 pm
3	Drug Trafficking And The Toddler	This episode focuses on:	English – 27 June 2021 (Sunday) – 8.30 pm Mandarin – 25 June 2021 (Friday) – 8.00 pm Malay – 30 June 2021 (Wednesday) – 9.00 pm Tamil – 2 July 2021 (Friday) – 9.30 pm
4	Unauthorised Purchases Online	This episode focuses on:	English – 22 August 2021 (Sunday) – 8.30 pm Mandarin – 27 August 2021 (Friday) – 8.00 pm Malay – 1 September 2021 (Wednesday) – 9.00 pm Tamil – 3 September 2021 (Friday) – 9.30 pm
5	Fatal Hit-and-run Accident	This episode focuses on:	English – 19 September 2021 (Sunday) – 8.30 pm Mandarin – 24 September 2021 (Friday) – 8.00 pm Malay – 29 September 2021 (Wednesday) – 9.00 pm Tamil – 1 October 2021 (Friday) – 9.00 pm
6	Robbery of $120,000 worth of stolen jewellery	This episode focuses on:	English – 24 October 2021 (Sunday) – 8.30 pm Mandarin – 29 October 2021 (Friday) – 8.00 pm Malay – 3 November 2021 (Wednesday) – 9.00 pm Tamil – 12 November 2021 (Friday) – 9.30 pm
7	Rideshare scam of over $26,000	This episode focuses on:	English – 21 November 2021 (Sunday) – 8.30 pm Mandarin – 26 November 2021 (Friday) – 8.00 pm Malay – 24 November 2021 (Wednesday) – 9.00 pm Tamil – 3 December 2021 (Friday) – 9.00 pm
8	Sham Marriage – A Marriage of Convenience to obtain a Long-Term Visit Pass	This episode focuses on: A Chinese couple trying to illegally obtain a Singapore permanent pass.	English – 26 December 2021 (Sunday) – 8.30 pm Mandarin – 31 December 2021 (Friday) – 8.00 pm Malay – 5 January 2022 (Wednesday) – 9.00 pm Tamil – 7 January 2022 (Friday) – 9.00 pm
9	A seemingly minor dispute leads to the murder of individual	This episode focuses on:	English – 16 January 2022 (Sunday) – 8.30 pm Mandarin – 21 January 2022 (Friday) – 8.00 pm Malay – 26 Jan 2022 (Wednesday) – 9.00 pm Tamil – 4 Feb 2022 (Friday) – 9.00 pm
10	A Group Of Eight Men Caught Rioting	This episode focuses on: Gang fight	English – 27 February 2022 (Sunday) – 8.30 pm Mandarin – 25 March 2022 (Friday) – 8.00 pm Malay – 2 March 2022 (Wednesday) – 9.00 pm Tamil – 4 March 2022 (Friday) – 9.00pm

=== Season 36 (2022) ===
No.	Title	Description	Airdate
1	Murder After A Misconstrued Relationship	This episode focuses on: The murder of a lady due to her cheating on the boyfriend.	English – 25 April 2022 (Monday) – 8.30 pm Mandarin – 29 April 2022 (Friday) – 8.00 pm Malay – 27 April 2022 (Wednesday) – 9.00 pm Tamil – 6 May 2022 (Friday) – 9.00 pm
2	China INTERPOL Officials Impersonation Scam	This episode focuses on: Impersonation scam	English – 29 May 2022 (Sunday) – 8.30 pm Mandarin – 27 May 2022 (Friday) – 8.00 pm Malay – 1 June 2022 (Wednesday) – 9.00 pm Tamil – 3 June 2022 (Friday) – 9.00 pm
3	Assault from runners of an unlicensed money lender	This episode focuses on: Loan Shark attack	English – 19 June 2022 (Sunday) – 8.30 pm Mandarin – 24 June 2022 (Friday) – 8.00 pm Malay – 22 June 2022 (Wednesday) – 9.00 pm Tamil – 1 July 2022 (Friday) – 9.00 pm
4	Hotel Booking Scam – Looking for good staycation deals? Watch out!	This episode focuses on: Online scam which lied about affordable hotel prices.	English – 24 July 2022 (Sunday) – 8.30pm Mandarin – 29 July 2022 (Friday) – 8.00 pm Malay – 27 July 2022 (Wednesday) – 9.00 pm Tamil – 5 August 2022 (Friday) – 9.00 pm
5	Illegal Departure thwarted by Woodlands Checkpoint officers	This episode focuses on: A man's attempt to depart illegally was thwarted by officers from the Immigration & Checkpoints Authority at Woodlands Checkpoint	English – 28 August 2022 (Sunday) – 8.30 pm Mandarin – 26 August 2022 (Friday) – 8.00 pm Malay – 17 August 2022 (Wednesday) – 9.00 pm Tamil – 2 September 2022 (Friday) – 9.00 pm
6	Geylang Stabbing – picking up the trail after an attack leaves two injured	This episode focuses on: Bedok Police Division pick up the trail after an attack leaves two men with grievous injuries	English – 16 October 2022 (Sunday) – 8.30 pm Mandarin – 28 October 2022 (Friday) – 8.00 pm Malay – 2 November 2022 (Wednesday) – 9.00 pm Tamil – 4 November 2022 (Friday) – 9.00 pm
7	Drug Trafficking	This episode focuses on: two drug traffickers to keep their deadly ware off our streets	English – 20 November 2022 (Sunday) – 8.30 pm Mandarin – 25 November 2022 (Friday) – 8.00 pm Malay – 23 November 2022 (Wednesday) – 9.00 pm Tamil – 2 December 2022 (Friday) – 9.00 pm
8	Cybercrime intercepted in the nick of time	This episode focuses on: series of unauthorised credit card transactions on an e-commerce platform	English – 25 December 2022 (Sunday) – 8.30 pm Mandarin – 30 December 2022 (Friday) – 8.00 pm Malay – 4 January 2023 (Wednesday) – 9.00 pm Tamil – 6 January 2023 (Friday) – 9.00 pm
9	Staged Kidnap and China Official Impersonation Scam	This episode focuses on: China police impersonation scam which tries to tricked the victim and his parents secretly by a staged kidnap.	English – 15 January 2023 (Sunday) – 8.30 pm Mandarin – 27 January 2023 (Friday) – 8.00 pm Malay – 25 January 2023 (Wednesday) – 9.00 pm Tamil – 3 February 2023 (Friday) – 9.00 pm
10	Part 1: Serangoon Road Slashing Part 2: Phishing Scam	This episode focuses on: a group of men attack another man in Serangoon Road; Phishing Scam	English – 12 February 2023 (Sunday) – 8.30 pm Mandarin – 24 February 2023 (Friday) – 8.00 pm Malay – 22 February 2023 (Wednesday) – 9.00 pm Tamil – 3 March 2023 (Friday) – 9.00 pm

=== Season 37 (2023) ===
No.	Title	Description	Airdate
1	Loanshark Network	This episode focuses on: Criminal Investigation Department work their way up the chain to cripple an unlicensed moneylending syndicate	English – 19 March 2023 (Sunday) – 8.30 pm Mandarin – 31 March 2023 (Friday) – 8.00 pm Malay – 29 March 2023 (Wednesday) – 9.00 pm Tamil – 28 April 2023 (Friday) – 9.00 pm
2	E-Commerce Scam	This episode focuses on: a series of e-commerce scams that involved 396 victims and over $100,000 in funds	English – 23 April 2023 (Sunday) – 8.30 pm Mandarin – 28 April 2023 (Friday) – 8.00 pm Malay – 3 May 2023 (Wednesday) – 9.00 pm Tamil – 5 May 2023 (Friday) – 9.30 pm
3	Armed Robbery	This episode focuses on: an armed robbery at a pawnshop	English – 21 May 2023 (Sunday) – 8.30 pm Mandarin – 26 May 2023 (Friday) – 8.00 pm Malay – 7 June 2023 (Wednesday) – 9.00 pm Tamil – 9 June 2023 (Friday) – 9.30 pm
4	Moneylender Robbery	This episode focuses on: a group of men robbed a moneylender	English – 18 June 2023 (Sunday) – 8.30 pm Mandarin – 30 June 2023 (Friday) – 8.00 pm Malay – 5 July 2023 (Wednesday) – 9.00 pm Tamil – 7 July 2023 (Friday) – 9.30 pm
5	Identity Theft	This episode focuses on: multi-million-dollar case of credit card identity theft	English – 23 July 2023 (Sunday) – 8.30 pm Mandarin – 28 July 2023 (Friday) – 8.00 pm Malay – 2 August 2023 (Wednesday) – 9.00 pm Tamil – 4 August 2023 (Friday) – 9.30 pm
6	Slashing Case between two young suspects	This episode focuses on: Two young suspects in a slashing case to justice	English – 13 August 2023 (Sunday) – 8.30 pm Mandarin – 25 August 2023 (Friday) – 8.00 pm Malay – 6 September 2023 (Wednesday) – 9.00 pm Tamil – 1 September 2023 (Friday) – 9.30 pm
7	Scam Thwarted by Joint Police-Bank Efforts	This episode focuses on: Anti-Scam Command investigators and co-located bank staff swiftly intervene to trace the funds and break up a money mule network	English – 10 September 2023 (Sunday) – 8.30 pm Mandarin – 29 September 2023 (Friday) – 8.00 pm Malay – 4 October 2023 (Wednesday) – 9.00 pm Tamil – 6 October 2023 (Friday) – 9.30 pm
8	#OneHomeTeam Against Drug Trafficking	This episode focuses on: vigilant officers of the Immigration and Checkpoints Authority detect a suspicious item during routine screening.; Officers of the Central Narcotics Bureau then swiftly round up suspects and dismantle a drug trafficking network	English – 29 October 2023 (Sunday) – 8.30 pm Mandarin – 27 October 2023 (Friday) – 8.00 pm Malay – 1 November 2023 (Wednesday) – 9.00 pm Tamil – 3 November 2023 (Friday) – 9.30 pm
9	Cybercrime Case	This episode focuses on: Technology Crime Investigation Branch swiftly follow the trail to arrest suspects and dismantle a cybercrime syndicate.	English – 19 November 2023 (Sunday) – 8.30 pm Mandarin – 24 November 2023 (Friday) – 8.00 pm Malay – 6 December 2023 (Wednesday) – 9.00 pm Tamil – 1 December 2023 (Friday) – 9.30 pm
10	Internet Love Scam and Money Mule Offences	This episode focuses on: a series of Internet love scams to stop the perpetrator and his network of money mules.	English – 17 December 2023 (Sunday) – 8.30 pm Mandarin – 29 December 2023 (Friday) – 8.00 pm Malay – 3 January 2024 (Wednesday) – 9.00 pm Tamil – 5 January 2024 (Friday) – 9.30 pm

=== Season 38 (2024) ===
No.	Title	Description	Airdate
1	Theft from a Money Changer	This episode focuses on: A case where two suspects took S$100,000 from a money changer and attempt to flee Singapore via Changi Airport. Will the suspects be successful in getting away?; Scam Alert: How to protect yourself from unsolicited job scams?	English – 24 March 2024 (Sunday) – 8.30 pm Mandarin – 29 March 2024 (Friday) – 8.00 pm Malay – 3 April 2024 (Wednesday) – 9.00 pm Tamil – 5 April 2024 (Friday) – 9.00 pm
2	Geylang Knife Attack	This episode focuses on: A case of an unprovoked knife attack where a male victim is left with multiple injuries. Officers from Bedok Division uses PolCams and other CCTV footage to apprehend the suspects.; Scam Alert: How to protect yourself from government official impersonation scams?	English – 21 April 2024 (Sunday) – 8.30 pm Mandarin – 26 April 2024 (Friday) – 8.00 pm Malay – 8 May 2024 (Wednesday) – 9.00 pm Tamil – 3 May 2024 (Friday) – 9.00 pm
3	Viewing and Possession of Child Abuse Materials	This episode focuses on: A case where officers from the Specialised Crime Branch investigate a suspect accused of viewing and downloading child abuse materials.; How to protect yourself from e-commerce scams?	English – 19 May 2024 (Sunday) – 8.30 pm Mandarin – 24 May 2024 (Friday) – 8.00 pm Malay – 5 June 2024 (Wednesday) – 9.00 pm Tamil – 7 June 2024 (Friday) – 9.00 pm
4	Cheating	This episode focuses on: A case where a serial scammer cheats her victims out of thousands of dollars.; Scam Alert: What to do if you receive a fake friend call?	English – 23 June 2024 (Sunday) – 8.30 pm Mandarin – 28 June 2024 (Friday) – 8.00 pm Malay – 3 July 2024 (Wednesday) – 9.00 pm Tamil – 5 July 2024 (Friday) – 9.00 pm
5	Affray	This episode focuses on: A case where a disagreement between two groups of people lead to a fight in public.; Scam Alert: Protecting yourself from unsolicited text messages promising fantastic returns on an investment.	English – 21 July 2024 (Sunday) – 8.30 pm Mandarin – 26 July 2024 (Friday) – 8.00 pm Malay – 7 August 2024 (Wednesday) – 9.00 pm Tamil – 9 August 2024 (Friday) – 9.00 pm
6	Sale of Payment Accounts, with Money Mule Offences	This episode focuses on: A case where a fake housekeeping advert is a scam. Victim's funds were transferred to a criminal network.	English – 25 August 2024 (Sunday) – 8.30 pm Mandarin – 30 August 2024 (Friday) – 8.00 pm Malay - 4 September 2024 (Wednesday) – 9.00 pm Tamil – 6 September 2024 (Friday) – 9.00 pm
7	Housebreaking and Theft	This episode focuses on: A case where a burglar is thwarted in a quiet neighbourhood. The burglar attempts to flee the country. Officers from Bedok Division race to catch the suspect before he/she flees.	English – 15 September 2024 (Sunday) – 8.30 pm Mandarin – 27 September 2024 (Friday) – 8.00 pm Malay – 9 October 2024 (Wednesday) – 9.00 pm Tamil – 11 October 2024 (Friday) – 9.00 pm
8	Government Official Impersonation Scam & Investment Scam	This episode focuses on: A series of cases from a homemaker to a seasoned investor being scammed. Officers from the Anti-Scam Command attempt to thwart more losses with the assistance of vigilant bank employees.; Scam Alert: Learn more about the enhanced ScamShield suite.	English – 20 October 2024 (Sunday) – 8.30 pm Mandarin – 25 October 2024 (Friday) – 8.00 pm Malay – 6 November 2024 (Wednesday) – 9.00 pm Tamil – 1 November 2024 (Friday) – 9.00 pm
9	CNB and SPF Joint Operation	This episode focuses on: A joint operation by the Central Narcotics Bureau (CNB) and Singapore Police Force (SPF) on apprehending a drug abuser who abandoned his partner's baby.; Scam Alert: Learn more about social media impersonation scams.	English – 24 November 2024 (Sunday) – 8.30 pm Mandarin – 29 November 2024 (Friday) – 8.00 pm Malay – 4 December 2024 (Wednesday) – 9.00 pm Tamil – 6 December 2024 (Friday) – 9.00 pm
10	Attempted Armed Robbery	This episode focuses on: A case where a man attempted with rob a woman, causing hurt to the victim. How are investigators from the Tanglin Division able to apprehend the suspect within 24 hours?; Scam Alert: Learn more about internet love scams.	English – 22 December 2024 (Sunday) – 8.30 pm Mandarin – 3 January 2025 (Friday) – 8.00 pm Malay – 8 January 2025 (Wednesday) – 9.00 pm Tamil – 3 January 2025 (Friday) – 9.00 pm

=== Season 39 (2025) ===
No.	Title	Description	Airdate
1	Housebreaking and Theft; Mischief by Fire	This episode focuses on: A case where a repeat offender breaks into a moneylender shop and attempts to cover up his theft by burning the shop down. See how officers in the Tanglin Division apprehend the suspect in 13 hours.	English – 23 March 2025 (Sunday) – 8.30 pm Mandarin – 28 March 2025 (Friday) – 8.00 pm Malay – 9 April 2025 (Wednesday) – 9.00 pm Tamil – 4 April 2025 (Friday) – 9.00 pm
2	Fake Gold Ingots Cheating Case	This episode focuses on: A case where an unsuspecting TCM shop is scammed by a trio of suspects out of $4,000 from fake gold ingots. See how officers in the Central Division apprehend the suspect using PolCams.	English – 20 April 2025 (Sunday) – 8.29 pm Mandarin – 2 May 2025 (Friday) – 8.00 pm (delayed due to Party Political Broadcast 1); Malay – 7 May 2025 (Wednesday) – 9.00 pm Tamil – 2 May 2025 (Friday) – 9.00 pm
3	Criminal Breach of Trust	This episode focuses on: A case where a suspect defrauded $50,000 out of unsuspecting victims who were looking to collect lucrative Pokémon trading cards. In addition to scamming their victims, the suspect also filed a false police report on his fraudulent activities to cover his tracks. See how officers in the Woodlands Division piece the puzzle together in arresting this suspect.	English – 25 May 2025 (Sunday) – 8.30 pm Mandarin – 30 May 2025 (Friday) – 8.00 pm Malay – 4 June 2025 (Wednesday) – 9.00 pm Tamil – 13 June 2025 (Friday) – 9.00 pm
4	Assisting with Unlicensed Moneylending	This episode focuses on: A case where a domestic worker falls into a web of deception after borrowing from a seemingly legit online moneylender – only to find herself trapped. Watch how officers from Unlicensed Moneylending Strike Force connect the dots to prevent further offences.	English – 22 June 2025 (Sunday) – 8.30 pm Mandarin – 27 June 2025 (Friday) – 8.00 pm Malay – 2 July 2025 (Wednesday) – 9.00 pm Tamil – 4 July 2025 (Friday) – 9.00 pm
5	Donation Boxes Heist	This episode focuses on: A case where a trio go on a heist, stealing from donation boxes from various places of worship. But vigilant members of the public discover their ploy. Watch how officers from Ang Mo Kio Division piece together evidence and ultimately bring the offenders to justice.	English – 20 July 2025 (Sunday) – 8.30 pm Mandarin – 25 July 2025 (Friday) – 8.00 pm Malay – 6 August 2025 (Wednesday) – 9.00 pm Tamil – 1 August 2025 (Friday) – 9.00 pm
6	Investment Scam Money Mule Offences	This episode focuses on: A case where a woman falls for an investment scam and hands over her hard-earned money to a money mule. Watch how officers from Clementi Division conduct a successful intervention and arrest the money mule when he comes calling.	English – 24 August 2025 (Sunday) – 8.30 pm Mandarin – 29 August 2025 (Friday) – 8.00 pm Malay – 3 September 2025 (Wednesday) – 9.00 pm Tamil – 5 September 2025 (Friday) – 9.00 pm
7	Shop Theft	This episode focuses on: A case where five thieves plot a bold clothing heist, stealing $1,700 SGD in apparel until a sharp-eyed staff thwarted their plans. Watch how officers from Tanglin Division end their fashion crime spree and bring them to justice.	English – 21 September 2025 (Sunday) – 8.30 pm Mandarin – 26 September 2025 (Friday) – 8.00 pm Malay – 1 October 2025 (Wednesday) – 9.00 pm Tamil – 3 October 2025 (Friday) – 9.00 pm
8	Malware Phishing Scam and Money Mule Offences	This episode focuses on: A case where a seafood craving turns into a financial nightmare when a victim loses more than $80,000 SGD after downloading a seafood app embedded with malware. Watch how officers from the Anti-Scam Command take swift action to prevent further losses and unravel a money mule network.	English – 26 October 2025 (Sunday) – 8.30 pm Mandarin – 31 October 2025 (Friday) – 8.00 pm Malay – 5 November 2025 (Wednesday) – 9.00 pm Tamil – 7 November 2025 (Friday) – 9.00 pm
9	Traffic and Drug Offences	This episode focuses on: A case where a high-speed chase leads to a joint SPF (Police Force) and CNB (Central Narcotics Bureau) operation, exposing a web of drug offences. Watch how the Traffic Police work with the CNB to bring the offenders to justice.	English – 30 November 2025 (Sunday) – 8.30 pm Mandarin – 5 December 2025 (Friday) – 8.00 pm
10	Theft Onboard Aircraft	This episode focuses on: A case where $120,000 in cash belonging to a passenger was stolen mid-flight. Watch how officers from the Airport Police launches an investigation, looking at travel timelines, casino transactions and remittance trails.	English – 28 December 2025 (Sunday) – 8.30 pm Mandarin – 9 January 2026 (Friday) – 8.00 pm Malay – 7 January 2026 (Wednesday) – 9.00 pm Tamil – 2 January 2026 (Friday) – 9.30pm

=== Season 40 (2026) ===
No.	Title	Description	Airdate
1	Assisting with Unlicensed Moneylending	This episode focuses on: In our 40th anniversary season premiere, a man desperate to clear his unlicensed moneylending debts resorts to harassing others, causing alarm and fear. Will officers from Tanglin Division arrest him before he strikes again?	English – 22 March 2026 (Sunday) – 8.30 pm Mandarin – 27 March 2026 (Friday) – 8.00 pm Malay – 1 April 2026 (Wednesday) – 9.00 pm Tamil – 17 April 2026 (Friday) – 9.30 pm
2	Murder	This episode focuses on: Yishun infant murder - a nine-month-old baby boy was killed by his mother's boyfriend Mohamed Aliff Mohamed Yusoff, who was sentenced to life imprisonment and 15 strokes of the cane	English – 26 April 2026 (Sunday) – 8:30 pm Mandarin – 24 April 2026 (Sunday) – 8:30 pm Malay – 6 May 2026 (Wednesday) – 9.00 pm Tamil – 15 May 2026 (Friday) – 9.30 pm
3	Syndicated Shop Theft	This episode focuses on: Three women stole over $30,000 worth of items from multiple malls in Singapore.	English – 24 May 2026 (Sunday) – 8.30 pm Mandarin – 29 May 2026 (Friday) – 8.00 pm Malay – 10 June 2026 (Wednesday) – 9.00 pm Tamil – 12 June 2026 (Friday) – 9.30 pm
4	Extortion	This episode focuses on: A friendly meetup takes a dangerous turn when a young man brandishes a knife to extort money from his friend.	English – 21 June 2026 (Sunday) – 8.30 pm Mandarin – 26 June 2026 (Friday) – 8.00 pm Malay – 8 July 2026 (Wednesday) – 9.00 pm Tamil – 17 July 2026 (Friday) – 9.30 pm
5	Outrage of Modesty and Voyeurism	This episode focuses on: A masked e-bike rider preys on lone women across Singapore's neighbourhoods.	English – 19 July 2026 (Sunday) – 8.30 pm Mandarin – 31 July 2026 (Friday) – 8.00 pm Malay – 12 August 2026 (Wednesday) – 9.00 pm Tamil – 17 April 2026 (Friday) – 9.30 pm
6	A stolen car crash leads to abandoned passenger, drugs and weapons	This episode focuses on: A car crash – with an abandoned passenger, drugs and an assortment of weapons found at the vehicle	English – 30 August 2026 (Sunday) – 8.30 pm Mandarin – 28 August 2026 (Friday) – 8.00 pm Malay – 9 September 2026 (Wednesday) – 9.00 pm Tamil – 18 September 2026 (Friday) – 9.30 pm
7	Transnational Scam Syndicate	This episode focuses on: A transnational scam syndicate where investigation officers work with the Royal Malaysia Police to follow the trail of scammers targeting multiple victims, swiftly crippling a transnational syndicate.	English – 13 September 2026 (Sunday) – 8.30 pm Mandarin – 25 September 2026 (Friday) – 8.00 pm Malay – 30 September 2026 (Wednesday) – 9.00 pm Tamil – 2 October 2026 (Friday) – 9.30 pm
8	Overseas Spoofing Scam Syndicate	This episode focuses on: A scam syndicate disguises overseas calls as legitimate local numbers, deceiving victims into believing that they are speaking to government officials. As the number of reports mounts, the Anti-Scam Command works with officers from the Cyber Security Agency to unmask cybercrime activity operating hidden in a rented flat. This triggers a cross-border investigation that brings those involved to justice.	English – 18 October 2026 (Sunday) – 8.30 pm Mandarin – 30 October 2026 (Friday) – 8.00 pm Malay – 4 November 2026 (Wednesday) – 9.00 pm Tamil – 20 November 2026 (Friday) – 9.30 pm
9			
10			

== See also ==
- Crimewatch (Singaporean TV series)
- Singapore Police Force
