= Bedok North lift murder =

1994 murder of an elderly woman in Singapore

- Date: 16 April 1994
- Location: Bedok, Singapore
- Motive: Robbery
- Deaths: Loo Kwee Hwa, 80
- Convicted: Indra Wijaya Ibrahim, 22
- Convictions: Murder; Robbery
- Sentence: Death

Indra Wijaya Ibrahim, the drug abuser who killed Loo Kwee Hwa after robbing her.

On 16 April 1994, 80-year-old Loo Kwee Hwa (Chinese: 卢桂花; pinyin: Lú Guìhuā; Pe̍h-ōe-jī: Lô͘ Kùi-hoa), who was heading to a friend's Bedok North flat to go play cards with her acquaintances, was found murdered at a flight of stairs between the 15th and 16th floor of the same HDB block, and bloodstains containing her DNA were also found inside the lift she last entered. The gold jewellery which Loo was last seen wearing had also been stolen by her attacker.

Through police investigations, a 22-year-old unemployed man and drug addict named Indra Wijaya Ibrahim was arrested. Despite the fact that he argued he was intoxicated by alcohol and the effects of overdosing on anti-anxiety pills, Indra was found to be mentally sound at the time of killing Loo, and hence he was found guilty and condemned to death for the robbery and murder of Loo, and he was later hanged on 29 September 1995.

== Murder investigation ==
On 16 April 1994, a resident of a HDB block at Bedok North was shocked to see an old woman lying dead in a pool of blood on a flight of stairs between the 15th and 16th floor. The woman was slit on the throat, with a 7 cm long knife wound around her neck, and the lift she last entered was also stained with blood, and some shoeprints stained in blood were also discovered at the crime scene. A brown umbrealla believed to be the victim's was also found near to where her body was discovered. The handle of a paper cutter was also discovered at the scene of crime. The shocking sight drew many residents and onlookers, who all expressed their shock and rage at the fact that there was a lift robber who targeted a helpless old woman before killing her. Onlookers also told the police and reporters that the old woman was not a resident of their block.

The victim was 80-year-old Loo Kwee Hwa, who lived somewhere nearby in the neighbourhood of Bedok North, and she was described by her grandson as a healthy and loving grandmother who often go to meet with her elderly friends to play card games; however, Loo's bereaved family was too distraught to continue disclosing anything else to the press. On that day itself, Loo was supposed to visit a friend who lived at that particular block to play a card game when she was unexpectedly found murdered at that same block of flats. Loo's gold bangle and chain, which she last wore when she left her house, were also missing, which gave rise to the possibility that the motive for the murder was robbery, although her jade pendant and money were still left untouched. The police therefore sent a public nationwide appeal for witnesses to help provide any first-hand information about the case and even monitored the pawn shops in Singapore to trace any records of Loo's gold items being pawned. Later, the police were able to recover a gold chain from a Tampines pawn shop, and it was confirmed by one of Loo's sons to be his mother's. The police also received the identification and personal details of the person who pawned the chain, for which he received S$400.

Ten days after the murder, a 22-year-old drug addict named Indra Wijaya Ibrahim was arrested for the murder, and when he was arrested, Indra had his hand bandaged, which further raised the suspicion of the police. At first, Indra denied killing Loo and claimed he bought it from someone before pawning the chain. Afterwards, he finally admitted to the robbery and murder; he also led the police to another pawn shop where he pawned Loo's gold bangle, and the bloodied shoeprints found at the crime scene were also matched to Indra's shoes. Indra was charged on 30 April 1994 with murder, two weeks after Loo was robbed and killed.

== Background of Indra ==
Born in 1972 as the son of Ibrahim Awang, a Singaporean star footballer who made his name in the 1970s, Indra Wijaya Ibrahim began to abuse drugs at age 14, as a result of him being neglected by his parents who divorced, and he himself also had a history of stuttering from childhood, which added to his feelings of alienation. Indra also consumed opium and heroin, and he also drank alcohol despite being underaged. In 1986, while he was still studying, Indra had already tried anesthetic drugs.

Indra was first detained at a juvenile's home due to his drug addiction, after his parents first sent him there in November 1990. Indra spent four months at the facility and was able to quit heroin, but he still abuse other drugs and alcohol. On 3 July 1991, Indra first violated the law by committing robbery, and he was sentenced to eighteen months' probation, but he was sent to a drug rehabilitation centre in January 1992. It was only after he met his girlfriend when Indra finally lessen his drug intake.

== Trial proceedings ==
On 8 September 1994, Indra Wijaya Ibrahim stood trial at the High Court for the murder of Loo Kwee Hwa. At the first day of trial however, Indra requested to dismiss his lawyers Subhas Anandan and Mohamed Muzammil Mohamed, and the trial was postponed to 16 January 1995, with P. Suppiah representing Indra as his new lawyer, and the original trial judge T S Sinnathuray was replaced by S. Rajendran to hear the case. Lee Sing Lit was the trial prosecutor of the case.

The prosecution's case was that Indra had the intention to murder Loo due to his need for money. Indra had earlier confessed that he had targeted Loo after seeing her draped in gold and jewellery at the HDB block where she originally was to visit a friend. Indra also admitted to purchasing a paper cutter with the intention to commit robbery, and he also used it to slit Loo on the throat and even took away all her jewellery, after he put up a fight with the elderly woman, who tried to resist his attack with her umbrella. The murder weapon itself was never found despite search efforts by the police.

Indra's main defence was diminished responsibility. He stated that at that time, he and his girlfriend had fallen out due to a misunderstanding and hence, he wanted to buy her a birthday gift to celebrate her birthday on 18 April, and to reconcile with her. Indra stated that he was also depressed about the argument and hence, he drank heavily and took drugs again, despite staying away from it since his release from a drug rehabilitation centre (where he spent four months). He stated that on the day of the murder, he drank a whole bottle of stout and even took four Dormicum pills to relieve himself of his heartbreak. He also testified he was gradually intoxicated by the effects of alcohol and Dormicum pills, and it was so severe that when he followed Loo and began to rob her, he could not remember how he was armed with the knife and how he exactly harmed the old woman and caused her death.

The defence sought to reduce Indra's murder charge to culpable homicide not amounting to murder, as they relied on the diminished responsibility defence, stating that Indra should be spared the murder charge since he was unable to fully control himself when he commit the murder and was not conscious of his actions at the time. However, the prosecution directed the court's attention to the cold blooded and violent nature of the crime, stating that Indra had the clear intention to murder Loo, and was fully conscious of his actions, and they said that being a drug abuser, Indra could not have been easily intoxicated by the amount of alcohol and drugs he consumed and hence, they sought a guilty verdict of murder in Indra's case.

== Verdict and aftermath ==
On 6 February 1995, 22-year-old Indra Wijaya Ibrahim was found guilty of murder and condemned to death. Justice S. Rajendran, the trial judge, found that Indra was not suffering from diminished responsibility when he killed Loo, and he stated there was no evidence to support Indra's supposed consumption of alcohol and drugs at the time of the crime, despite acknowledging Indra as a drug abuser. He pointed out that even if Indra had really consumed them, he would not have been sufficiently impaired to the extent that he did not know what he was doing at the time of the murder. Had it been a frenzied attack, the injuries would have been all over Loo's body rather than being concentrated at her neck, which showed Indra was clearly intending to cause Loo's death during the robbery. By law, Indra automatically received the death penalty upon his conviction, since it was the mandatory sentence for murder under the law and the trial judge had no discretion to sentence him to any other punishment for murder.

When Loo's 87-year-old husband Chang Song Lian, her nine children and all her relatives heard that Indra was sentenced to death, all of them were glad to hear that justice was served and felt that the sentence was fair. Loo's 41-year-old son and commodities trader Chang Tian Kian stated his mother's killer "deserved it" and said it was a trauma for his nephews to witness her corpse. However, the whole family remained miserable about Loo's killing, especially Loo's husband, who used a wheelchair. Before his wife was killed, Chang, who was married with Loo for fifty years and had nine children and more than twenty grandchildren together, was still able to walk with a cane and his wife's assistance despite a severe stroke, but he lost the will to even leave his wheelchair since his wife's brutal murder, according to Loo's 44-year-old daughter Chang Kuang Nam, who stated that her father spent his time smoking and sometimes even asked where his wife was. Kuang Nam also stated that during the week before the verdict, the Chang family were unable to bring themselves to enjoy their reunion dinner due to Loo's death and absence from the Chinese New Year occasion.

== Execution ==
On 17 April 1995, Indra appealed against his death sentence and conviction, once again asking for the murder charge be reduced on the grounds that he was intoxicated by both the Dormicum pills and alcohol and thus was not fully himself at the time of the robbery and killing. However, the Chief Justice (CJ) Yong Pung How, who was similarly prescribed some Dormicum pills after a heart surgery and had personally experienced the pills' effects, stated that it was not possible for Indra to be severely intoxicated to the point of impairing his mental responsibility. CJ Yong and the other two judges therefore unanimously dismissed the appeal, after they found that Indra was clearly aware of the magnitude of his actions and thus he should be held fully culpable for murdering 80-year-old Loo Kwee Hwa. It was unknown if Indra submitted a petition for clemency to President Ong Teng Cheong as a final recourse to evade the gallows. If he did, his clemency petition was most likely dismissed.

For the charge of murdering Loo Kwee Hwa seventeen months earlier, 23-year-old Indra Wijaya Ibrahim was hanged by executioner Darshan Singh at Changi Prison on 29 September 1995. On the same morning itself, a Thai woman named Navarat Maykha, who was convicted in the high-profile trafficking of 3.184 kg of heroin, was also scheduled to hang at the same prison as Indra.

In the aftermath, Crimewatch re-enacted the Bedok North lift murder case and it aired in December 1996 as the tenth and final episode of the show's annual season.

== See also ==
- Capital punishment in Singapore
