= Pioneer Mall =

Shopping centre in Singapore

Pioneer Mall is a 4-storey neighbourhood shopping centre in Jurong West, Singapore, constructed in 2004. The mall is mainly intended to serve residents living in the surrounding Housing and Development Board (HDB) flats. It is located beside the Jurong West Hawker Centre (which opened in 2017) and nearby the Pioneer MRT station. Prominent tenants include the hypermarket chain Giant, Singaporean food court operator Koufu and McDonald's fast food restaurant.

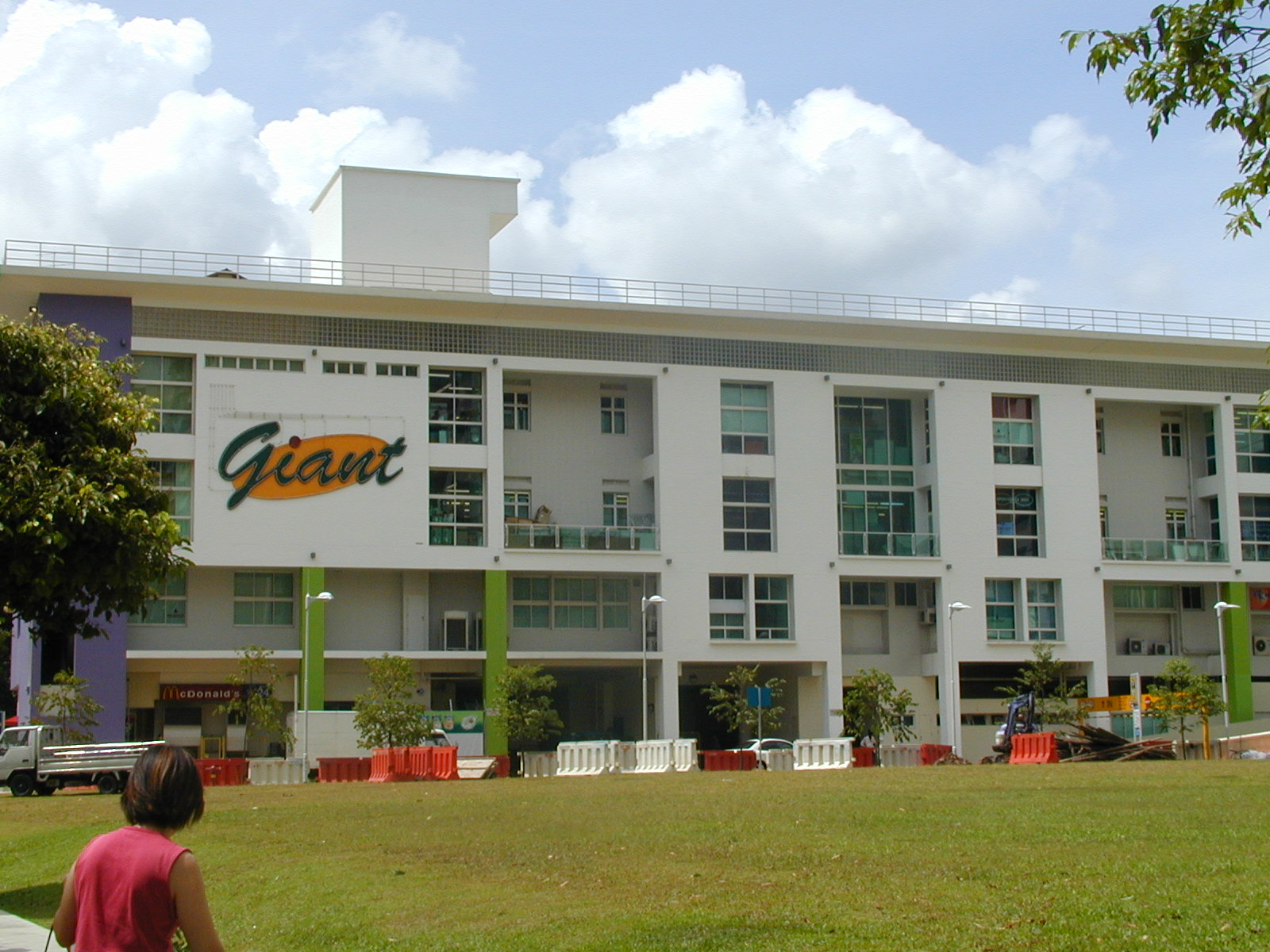
Pioneer Mall in 2006.

The Housing and Development Board set up a HDB Pioneer Service Centre at the shopping centre in November 2004, which closed on 29 June 2019.

Activities are often held here to bond the community together, through activities organised by the HDB, the South West CDC and West Coast Town Council.
