= Murder of Ho Hon Sing =

1989 murder of a moneylender at Beach Road, Singapore

- Date: 3 August 1989; 36 years ago
- Location: Beach Road, Singapore
- Type: Murder by pushing
- Motive: Revenge for loan denial
- Deaths: 1
- Convicted: Yeo Watt Song
- Sentence: Death by hanging

Ho Hon Sing (c. 1955 – 3 August 1989; Chinese: 何汉成; Jyutping: Ho4 Hon3 Sing4; Cantonese Yale: Hòh Hon Sìhng) was a 34-year-old loan shark who was found dead on 3 August 1989 at the foot of a Housing and Development Board (HDB) block at Beach Road, Singapore. Initially thought to have committed suicide, he was later found to have been drugged and thrown off the flat's common corridor by his childhood friend, 37-year-old Yeo Watt Song (c. 1952 – c. March 1994; Chinese: 杨越松; Pe̍h-ōe-jī: Iông Oa̍t Siông; Tâi-lô: Iông Ua̍t Siông).

== Murder ==
At about 2 pm (UTC+08:00) on 3 August 1989, Yeo lured Ho into a block of flats in Beach Road on the pretext of getting some heroin there. Once Ho arrived, Yeo offered him a soda, which he had spiked with ten Upjohn-brand sleeping tablets. Ho drunk it and soon began to feel drowsy.

Yeo took all of Ho's valuables, including his wallet, various gold jewelry, and a Rolex watch. He then brought the now unconscious Ho to a common corridor (Note: Sources differ on which storey Ho was pushed from; contemporary sources claim he fell from the 13th, while more recent sources claim he fell from the 12th.) and pushed him off a common corridor, disposing of his NRIC in a nearby river and handing the jewelry to a fence.

== Investigation ==
Police arrived at the flat at around 4 pm; as Ho did not have his NRIC on him, it took two days for his body to be identified. As there was no evidence of foul play, his death was initially ruled to be either a suicide. Ho's wife, however, had her suspicions and notified police of various incongruities in the crime scene), as well a "suspicious" phone call she had received on the day after Ho's death, in which the caller said "Ah Sing will not be sleeping at home tonight".

Following this, an autopsy was done on his body, which showed that he had trace amounts of morphine in his system. On 13 November, the case was then transferred to the Special Investigation Section of the Criminal Investigation Department. Interviews with flat residents and Ho's wife led law enforcement to Yeo, who was arrested on 28 December and confessed to the murder.

== Trial of Yeo Watt Song ==
On 26 November 1992, Yeo Watt Song stood trial for the murder of Ho Hon Sing, with Judge T. S. Sinnathuray presiding over the trial.

=== Trial hearing ===
Deputy Public Prosecutor Bala Reddy tendered Yeo's police statement as evidence. According to his police statement, on the night of 2 August 1989, Yeo and Ho were consuming drugs together. Yeo had noticed that Ho was wearing a gold chain, three gold rings and a Rolex watch. Ho had also shown him $6000 which he had collected from debtors. However when Yeo asked him for a loan of $1000, he was turned down. This made Yeo think of Ho as boastful, and he wanted to get revenge. As such, he hatched his plan to rob and kill Ho.

The defence argued that as Yeo had consumed heroin that day, he was not aware of what had happened when he was with Ho after they went up to the fifteenth floor. They had initially gone up with the intention of purchasing drugs, but could not find the drug dealer. At this point, both of them became drowsy due to the drugs they had consumed earlier, and Yeo did not know what happened to Ho afterwards.

The defence sought the testimony of an expert witness, Associate Professor Edmund Lee Jon Deoon from the National University of Singapore's Pharmacology Department, about the effects of the sleeping tablets. Associate Professor Lee testified that the tablets could have side effects of anxiety and hallucinations, which could have caused Yeo to push Ho off the building without being consciously aware of his actions.

The prosecution's expert witness, Dr Chan Khim Yew, head of the Prisons Medical Unit in Changi Prison, rebutted this argument. According to Dr Chan's testimony, he does not find it plausible that Yeo would be so intoxicated by the drugs that he was unaware of what he was doing. He felt that Yeo was able to tell right from wrong and was mentally capable of carrying out his murderous intent.

=== Verdict ===
On 3 December, Judge Sinnathuray concluded that the prosecution had proven that Yeo was guilty of murder, and sentenced Yeo to the mandatory death penalty. On an unknown date in March 1994, Yeo Watt Song was hanged in Changi Prison.

== See also ==
- List of major crimes in Singapore
