= East Coast Parkway murder =

1981 case of a boilerman's disappearance and murder in Singapore

- Date: 20 September 1981
- Location: East Coast Parkway, Singapore
- Motive: Out of hatred over unsettled conflicts
- Deaths: Kalingam Mariappan, 45
- Convicted: Rathakrishnan Ramasamy, 16; Ramu Annadavascan, 22
- Sentence: Ramu - Death penalty Rathakrishnan - Indefinite detention at the President's Pleasure

On 20 September 1981, Kalingam Mariappan, a 45-year-old boilerman, was last seen entering a lorry with two men, after the three of them had drinks, and by a third man at the coffee shop. He was missing for two days before his wife reported him missing. The two men last seen with Kalingam were eventually brought in for questioning by the police, and one of them admitted that Kalingam was dead and they were responsible for assaulting him and setting his body on fire. Kalingam's body was later found at the East Coast Parkway, and the two suspects – 22-year-old lorry driver Ramu Annadavascan and 16-year-old news vendor Rathakrishnan Ramasamy – were both charged with murder. Eventually the trial court sentenced Ramu to death for murder while the other, Rathakrishnan, was imprisoned indefinitely under the President's Pleasure since he was still underaged when he killed Kalingam. Rathakrishnan is presently released since 2001, while Ramu was hanged on 19 September 1986 after losing his appeals against his conviction and sentence.

== Disappearance and death ==
45-year-old Kalingam Mariappan, a boilerman reported missing before he was found dead.

On 22 September 1981, A. Supalatmi reported to the police that her husband, 45-year-old boilerman Kalingam Mariappan, had gone missing for two days. According to Supalatmi, Kalingam had last left home on 20 September to go to work, but never came back. The police therefore conducted investigations into the disappearance of Kalingam. One of the witnesses questioned was 18-year-old N. Selvarajoo, a distant relative of the missing man. Selvarajoo told police that he last saw Kalingam at a coffee shop, drinking beer with three other young men, two of whom he identified as 16-year-old news vendor Rathakrishnan Ramasamy and 22-year-old lorry driver Ramu Annadavascan (alias Botak). The third young man last seen with Kalingam was later identified as Perumal Ramasamy, who was later questioned by police.

Perumal said that after their drinks session, Ramu invited them to go to Changi Airport for more drinks, as at that time, Terminal 1 had just opened and it was a popular spot for Singaporeans to hang out. At first, Kalingam and Perumal declined as Perumal wanted to head home while Kalingam wanted to go to work. Perumal said that after Ramu assured Kalingam he would bring him to work after the trip to Changi Airport, Kalingam relented and therefore entered Ramu's lorry with Ramu and Rathakrishnan. According to Perumal, who did not join them and went back home, it was the last time he saw Kalingam alive.

On 24 September, both Ramu and Rathakrishnan were brought into custody for questioning. During interrogation, Rathakrishnan confessed to the police that Kalingam was dead and the body was located at the forest in East Coast Parkway. Rathakrishnan led the police to the site the next day, where the charred corpse of a man in a high state of decomposition was found, as well as an identity card belonging to Kalingam and a tin filled with leftover petrol. The case was therefore classified as murder and Inspector Leong Kong Hong took over the investigations. The body was later identified as the missing man, 45-year-old Kalingam Mariappan. Rathakrishnan and Ramu were both officially placed under arrest and charged with murder.

This was not the first time Ramu faced a murder charge. He was once charged in 1979 for killing a boy, Aga Khan Suratte, during a fight between two large groups but was eventually let off with a S$230 fine after his murder charge was reduced to one of affray. Just five months before getting his second charge of murder, Ramu had punched a policeman Khoo Kwek Leong during a Thaipusam festival when he got into a fight over a lost drum, and he was fined S$500 for an assault charge.

== Murder trial ==
=== Prosecution's case ===
On 26 June 1984, both 24-year-old Ramu Annadavascan and 18-year-old Rathakrishnan Ramasamy stood trial at the High Court for the murder of 45-year-old Kalingam Mariappan. Spencer Gwee was in charge of the prosecution's case, while both Ramu and Rathakrishnan were represented by Subhas Anandan and R Palakrishnan during the court proceedings. Coincidentally, Anandan was the lawyer who had once represented him during the first two court cases Ramu got involved in before.

Professor Chao Tzee Cheng, the senior forensic pathologist, came to court to present his autopsy report on the victim's death. He testified that there were three skull fractures on Kalingam's head, which were caused by an instrument with several sharp pointed prongs, like a gardening rake. He stated that there were at least three blows inflicted with great force on Kalingam's head, and without timely medical attention, Kalingam would have died within a few minutes or half an hour. Professor Chao also discovered soot particles inside the lungs, meaning that Kalingam was still alive when he was set on fire by either Ramu or Rathakrishnan or both of them, and the severity of the burns (which covered 40% of the body) were also sufficient to cause Kalingam's death, even if without the skull injuries he sustained.

It was the prosecution's case that one of the defendants, Ramu, had the motive to commit murder, as there had been bad blood between Ramu and Kalingam, who both often argued with each other over petty issues. According to the prosecution, Ramu had been having disputes and fights with Kalingam's brothers-in-law and their friends, and it was said that Kalingam had spread false tales and rumours about Ramu, causing Ramu to be assaulted by one of Kalingam's brother-in-laws. Due to this, the prosecution contended that Ramu formed the intention to kill as a result of hatred against Kalingam. Kalingam's wife testified that Ramu had threatened to kill her husband and make their seven children fatherless. Selvarajoo, who was one of the last witnesses seeing Kalingam alive, also testified that Ramu had confessed to killing Kalingam with Rathakrishnan's abetment and taunted Selvarajoo to go to the murder site to see his body. Under the cross-examination by Ramu's lawyer, Selvarajoo denied that he gave the testimony out of spite due to Ramu having previously assaulted him on several occasions. The witness statements by another witness Perumal, who was killed by a friend during a fight over drugs prior to the trial, were also admitted as evidence. Perumal's friend, 30-year-old Retnam Kunasekar, was later jailed seven years for manslaughter.

Subsequently, both Rathakrishnan and Ramu argued that their statements were not made voluntarily and stated they were assaulted by officers who forced them to admit to the murder. However, these allegations were denied by the trial court.

=== Ramu's defence ===
Ramu Annadavascan, who claimed he only wanted to assault Kalingam and never intended to burn him alive.

Ramu was the first to go to the stand to give his testimony. He stated that on the day of the murder, he was having drinks with Kalingam, Rathakrishnan, and the fourth man Perumal. He said that he hoped that this session would be a way for him and Kalingam to bury the hatchet and resolve their differences. However, while he, Kalingam, and Rathakrishnan were on the way to Changi Airport, he and Kalingam got engaged into an argument once again and hence, he stopped the lorry at the East Coast Parkway and he therefore used a gardening rake to hit Kalingam on the head. Similarly, Rathakrishnan joined in to inflict two subsequent blows on Kalingam's head as well. After this, Ramu and Rathakrishnan thought that Kalingam had died and therefore decided to set his body on fire to destroy evidence of his death. Ramu said they never expected that Kalingam would suddenly regain consciousness and rolled around on the ground in pain, and they had no choice but to leave him due to them unable to do anything to help him.

Subhas Anandan, Ramu's lawyer, submitted that his client had no intention to cause death. Anandan said that his client genuinely believed that Kalingam was dead when he set him on fire. He also argued that Kalingam's death was not within the calculations of Ramu's mind and therefore, the act of him setting Kalingam on fire and unexpectedly causing his death should be regarded as voluntarily causing grievous hurt or culpable homicide not amounting to murder. However, Deputy Public Prosecutor (DPP) Spencer Gwee argued that Ramu had the intention and motive to commit murder since he made threats on Kalingam's safety and life due to the unsettled conflicts they had between them and also argued that it was corroborated by the fact that Ramu took the longest route to Changi Airport and took Kalingam to a secluded spot at East Coast Parkway to assault and set Kalingam on fire, and even pointed out that Ramu had knowingly set Kalingam on fire to intentionally let him be burned alive.

=== Rathakrishnan's defence ===
Rathakrishnan Ramasamy, who claimed he was threatened by Ramu into assaulting Kalingam and setting him on fire

Rathakrishnan, who also elected to give his defence, told the court his version of what happened. His main defence was that he was fearful of Ramu and that he had threatened him to help assault and kill Kalingam. Rathakrishnan stated that he had to obey because of his fear of Ramu and his past experience of being assaulted by Ramu prior to Kalingam's murder. Rathakrishnan recounted that when he was on the lorry, he thought Ramu was driving a shortcut to Changi Airport, but Ramu drove to East Coast Parkway and forcibly dragged the drunken Kalingam out of the lorry. Rathakrishnan said Ramu shouted at him angrily to come down with the gardening rake, which Ramu used to hit at Kalingam's head first, before ordering Rathakrishnan to hit Kalingam twice.

After the deadly assault, Rathakrishnan claimed that Ramu had threatened him, warning him not to attempt to escape. He was instructed to retrieve the petrol and pour it over Kalingam's unconscious body before Ramu set him on fire. Rathakrishnan stated he never knew Kalingam was still alive, but when he saw Kalingam suddenly get up in pain and run all around the forest, calling out "Mother" in Indian, Rathakrishnan wanted to help but Ramu stopped him, threatening him to get back into the lorry. When questioned by DPP Gwee about why he did not tell the police that he tried to help Kalingam, Rathakrishnan explained that he thought the police would not believe him if he said it and therefore he felt he should only reveal it to the court. He also denied the prosecution's contention that Ramu had never threatened him all along and denied that he intentionally joined in Ramu's pre-arranged plan to kill Kalingam.

=== Sentence ===
On 3 July 1984, the two trial judges – Justice Abdul Wahab Ghows and Justice T S Sinnathuray – delivered their verdict.

Justice Sinnathuray, who read out the judgement in court, stated that both judges were satisfied beyond a reasonable doubt that both men were guilty of the "brutal and gruesome" murder of Kalingam and were also satisfied beyond a reasonable doubt that both defendants shared the common intention to cause grievous harm to the victim, such that the injury was sufficient in the ordinary course of nature to cause death. Justice Sinnathuray stated that Ramu had directly attacked Kalingam with the rake without giving him the chance or hope to put up any resistance and also pointed out that the defendants had admitted to seeing the unconscious Kalingam getting up in pain after they set him on fire under the belief that he had died, and this only discredited their claims of having no intention to commit murder.

Therefore, the trial court found both Ramu and Rathakrishnan guilty of murder. However, on the account that one of the defendants, Rathakrishnan, was sixteen years of age and had not reached 18 at the time of the murder, the trial judges ordered that Rathakrishnan, who was 18 at that point of time, should be imprisoned indefinitely at the President's Pleasure, since the law forbids the imposition of capital punishment for minors who committed murder while they were below 18 years old. Hence, only the first defendant Ramu Annadavascan, then 24 years old, was condemned to death for murdering 45-year-old Kalingam Mariappan. According to news reports, although Ramu was calm during the proceedings, Ramu's mother was devastated and distraught at the death sentence being passed upon Ramu, who was her eldest child out of four children. Ramu's mother and his female relatives had to be escorted out of court as they increasingly became hysterical over the verdict.

== Appeal process ==
On 14 January 1985, the appeals by both Ramu and Rathakrishnan against their convictions for Kalingam's murder were dismissed by the Court of Appeal. In dismissing the appeals, the Chief Justice Wee Chong Jin, who heard the appeal with Justice L P Thean and Justice F A Chua, stating that the three judges were of the opinion that there was no arguable point from the defence to raise doubts over the evidence of the men's common intention to kill Kalingam, and therefore upheld both Ramu's death sentence and Rathakrishnan's jail term.

Ramu later applied for special leave to appeal to the Privy Council of London against the sentence, but his plea was subsequently denied.

== Ramu's execution ==
On 19 September 1986, for the charge of killing 45-year-old Kalingam Mariappan, 27-year-old Ramu Annadavascan was hanged at dawn in Changi Prison.

In November 1986, it was revealed that Ramu, together with another prisoner Wong Foot Ling, offered to donate their kidneys and corneas for organ transplant patients before their sentences were carried out. Wong, who was executed on the same day as Ramu, was found guilty and given the death penalty for the 1983 murder of his lover Khor Gek Hong. Prison authorities also confirmed that the two female patients who received the men's corneas were recovering well in hospital. As of November 1986, a total of eighteen people, including infamous child killer Adrian Lim and serial killer Sek Kim Wah, remained on death row for murder and drug offences after Ramu and Wong were both put to death.

== Aftermath ==
=== Rathakrishnan's release ===
In the aftermath of his trial and appeal, Rathakrishnan Ramasamy was imprisoned at the President's Pleasure (TPP), with his sentence taking effect from the date of his arrest. He spent nearly twenty years in jail before he was released in September 2001, at the age of 36. According to a documentary that featured the case, Rathakrishnan studied in prison and passed his GCE O-levels and obtained a certificate. It was also revealed that after his release, Rathakrishnan was employed by his relative and he worked for the relative. Aside from this, Rathakrishnan led a low-profile life and further details of his later life is not known.

In December 2001, Rathakrishnan was approached by a newspaper to speak about his life in prison while under TPP, with the paper changing his name to protect his identity. During the interview, Rathakrishnan expressed remorse for murdering Kalingam, and he stated that during his past twenty years behind bars, he was first remanded for two years and five months at Queenstown Remand Prison since the date of his arrest before he was transferred to Changi Prison in 1984 after the end of his trial, where he served the remainder of his TPP sentence. Rathakrishnan revealed that after his arrival at Changi Prison, he spent his next twelve years living in a heavily guarded single cell due to his conviction for murder. Rathakrishnan stated that even before his arrival, the inmates at Changi Prison were already aware of his offence and he described his first day there as a "frightening" experience as a result. Rathakrishnan also stated that overall, he had a very tough life in jail. The interview was conducted during the same month when a 15-year-old boy was found guilty of killing an insurance agent under the instigation of the victim's husband Anthony Ler; Ler was hanged for abetting the murder while the youth was imprisoned indefinitely under the TPP like Rathakrishnan.

=== In popular media ===
21 years after Kalingam died, Singaporean crime show True Files re-enacted the case of Kalingam's murder, and it first aired as the 13th episode of the show's first season on 25 July 2002. However, the episode invoked the anger of Kalingam's son and his family members over the production team not seeking their opinion or approval about re-adapting the case of his father's murder, because according to Kalingam's son (who was eight at the time of Kalingam's death), his mother, whom he thought to have left the incident behind her, was re-traumatized at the sight of her husband's murder being featured on television.

Aside from this, Rathakrishnan's former lawyer R Palakrishnan, who eventually died in 2003, was interviewed inside the episode, and as he spoke about his former client's case, he stated that Rathakrishnan himself should have backed out of the deed should he genuinely had no intention to assault the victim, instead of choosing to continue pouring petrol and assault Kalingam. Palakrishnan also stated that as a result of these actions, the courts deemed that it did not show his client was truly fearful of Ramu Annadavascan and did the killing under duress, which was a legitimate finding made under the law.

Subhas Anandan, who formerly represented Ramu in his trial for murder, recorded the case in his memoir The Best I Could, which was first published in 2009. Anandan admitted in his book that he had represented Ramu twice previously before his conviction for murdering Kalingam, and had helped him reduce charges to the lower ones and sought a fine for him. He questioned if Ramu might have thought he was invincible as a result of him escaping the murder charge once when he killed Kalingam, and had some regret for putting in his best efforts to defend Ramu during these three occasions.

Anandan also revealed that during the investigations into Kalingam's murder, it was suspected by the prosecution that there were about four people involved, but the investigations stopped there since Ramu and Rathakrishnan insisted they were the only ones involved and said there were no more assailants. Anandan revealed that a few years after Ramu was executed, he met a client who was charged with killing his friend in a fight over drugs. That client, who happened to be Ramu's friend, admitted to Anandan that on the day of the murder, he and the friend (also the same person he killed) were actually together on the lorry with Kalingam, Ramu, and Rathakrishnan. He stated that he and the friend were unaware that Ramu and Rathakrishnan wanted to kill Kalingam and they only realized Kalingam had died after seeing only Ramu and Rathakrishnan returning to the lorry. Anandan concluded that his client, who expressed regret for the killing he was charged for, was indeed not an accomplice of Kalingam's murder, and the client never held any grudge against him for Ramu's execution. The client was subsequently sentenced to eight years' imprisonment for a reduced charge of culpable homicide not amounting to murder.

=== Renewed attention of case ===
In January 2018, the case of Rathakrishnan was recalled once again as one of the notable cases of minors imprisoned under TPP for murder, when a TPP detainee, who was 15 years old when he helped Anthony Ler to kill his wife in 2001, appealed for clemency to remit the remainder of his sentence on account of his good behaviour and rehabilitation process. By then, the TPP indefinite detention measure was abolished since 2010, allowing courts to impose life imprisonment for minors who commit murder or other capital crimes while below 18 years of age. Subsequently, after making the plea, the convict, who was then 32, was granted clemency and released from jail in November 2018 after spending 17 years behind bars.

== See also ==
- Capital punishment in Singapore
- The President's Pleasure (Singapore)
