= Stirling Road murder =

2007 high-profile spousal murder case in Singapore

Smaelmeeral Abdul Aziz
- Born: Smaelmeeral binte Abdul Aziz; 1975; Singapore
- Died: 1 July 2007 (aged 32); Queenstown, Singapore
- Cause of death: Murdered
- Other name: Meera
- Occupation: Production operator
- Known for: Murder victim
- Children: 1 son and 1 daughter

On 1 July 2007, 38-year-old odd-job worker Tharema Vejayan Govindasamy murdered his 32-year-old ex-wife Smaelmeeral Abdul Aziz by flinging her off the 13th floor of a HDB block in Stirling Road, Queenstown, after they got into an argument which eventually escalated into an assault before Smaelmeeral was thrown to her death. Tharema, who was charged with murder, claimed that his in-laws had used black magic to break up his marriage out of religious differences and also insisted that his ex-wife had fallen to her death as a suicide, but the High Court found Tharema guilty of murdering Smaelmeeral and hence, he was sentenced to hang on 25 May 2009.

== Murder of Smaelmeeral Abdul Aziz ==
=== Investigations ===
On 1 July 2007, 61-year-old Goh Chin Hock, a SBS Transit bus driver, was waiting at a bus-stop in front of a HDB block along Stirling Road, Queenstown, when he heard a loud "thud" sound and turned around, witnessing the body of a young woman lying dead at the void deck of that same HDB block. Another witness, Hamzah Rasip, also witnessed the body and called the police.

The victim was identified as 32-year-old Smaelmeeral Abdul Aziz, a production operator and mother of two children. Dr Gilbert Lau, the forensic pathologist who examined the victim's body, found that Smaelmeeral died as a result of multiple injuries (including skull fractures) caused by a fall. A broken tooth was also found at the bus stop in front of the HDB block where Smaelmeeral fell to her death, where the police deduced could be the original crime scene. Witnesses also stated that Smaelmeeral was arguing with a man, and heard some screams and a "thud" sound, and the lift of the block where Smaelmeeral died was found with many bloodstains, and more of them were discovered nearby the parapet of the 13th floor, which showed that Smaelmeeral may have been assaulted in the lift before she fell to her death from the 13th floor. Two bus drivers also told police that they saw a man walking away from the crime scene after he reached the ground floor and looked at the body.

The police investigations eventually led to the police identifying one possible suspect, whom they believed to be 38-year-old Tharema Vejayan Govindasamy, who was Smaelmeeral's former husband, and they also publicly listed him on the wanted list, seeking crucial information to arrest him.

The murder of Smaelmeeral happened on the same date as the murder of Manap Sarlip, who was killed by his wife's 17-year-old lover Muhammad Nasir Abdul Aziz, who was instigated and manipulated by Manap's wife Aniza Essa to commit the brutal murder at Whampoa. Both cases were compared to be similar in nature due to the murder victims being the spouse of their alleged murderers. Aniza was given a nine-year jail term for manslaughter on the grounds of diminished responsibility while Muhammad Nasir was imprisoned indefinitely under the President's Pleasure after he pleaded guilty to murder since his age of 17 made him ineligible for the death penalty (only allowed for offenders aged 18 and above).

=== Arrest and charges ===
Two days after he allegedly murdered his ex-wife, on 3 July 2007, Tharema surrendered himself to the police for killing his ex-wife. He was charged in a district court the next day with one count of murdering Smaelmeeral. He was committed to stand trial at the High Court after a preliminary hearing on 19 March 2008.

Background information revealed that Tharema and Smaelmeeral were married in June 2002. They had two children, a son born in March 2003 and a daughter born in Nov 2005. About five years after they married, Smaelmeeral filed for divorce in March 2007 and obtained an interim judgment for divorce on 13 June 2007, more than two weeks before she was murdered. Smaelmeeral and her ex-husband were not in close contact with her family as her parents disapproved of their marriage, but nonetheless, Smaelmeeral was the favourite child of her father, who mourned her death together with her remaining kin.

== Trial of Tharema Vejayan Govindasamy ==
=== Court proceedings ===
In August 2008, 39-year-old Tharema Vejayan Govindasamy stood trial for the murder of his ex-wife at the High Court. The prosecution was led by David Khoo, Stella Tan & Adrian Ooi, while Tharema was represented by prosecutor-turned lawyer Glenn Knight and three other lawyers S Radakrishnan, Aziz Tayabali, and Rajan Supramaniam. The trial was presided by Justice Tay Yong Kwang of the High Court.

During the trial, the court was told that after the birth of their daughter, the couple's marriage began to deteriorate, and they also frequently argued with one another, and Tharema also abused his wife regularly. Tharema was Hindu while Smaelmeeral was Muslim, and hence their religious differences also caused a rift in the couple's relationship, and on a few occasions, Smaelmeeral went out to drink with her colleagues after her night shift, and this incurred displeasure from Tharema. Tharema also did not maintain a stable job, and hence Smaelmeeral had to work night shifts to supplement the family income. Eventually, Smaelmeeral moved out after she discovered her husband sleeping with another woman. Due to her husband's abuse, Smaelmeeral gradually became alcoholic and she was also hospitalized in the Institute of Mental Health at one point. The multiple marital issues eventually made Smaelmeeral decided to file for divorce. According to Tharema, he blamed his wife's sister Hametah for causing their marriage to worsen and break down, because he suspected that his sister-in-law and her other family members had placed some black magic onto him and his wife, causing Smaelmeeral and himself to argue frequently and their relationship to deteriorate until it became irreparable, and he had also invited several bomohs on a few occasions in an attempt to dissipate the purported black magic. Smaelmeeral's sister and her relatives denied that they had done so despite the assertions of Tharema and his defence counsel in court. Tharema also testified that he had witnessed Smaelmeeral having an affair with at least two other men, and this also contributed to the deterioration of their relationship.

On the morning of 1 July 2007 when Tharema murdered Smaelmeeral, he was riding the car of his friend, Abdul Razak P Maudu, who threw a party at a pub to celebrate his birthday and invited Tharema over. Tharema, who drank at least ten glasses of alcoholic drinks at the party, asked Abdul Razak to bring him to the location of Smaelmeeral, who earlier called Abdul Razak that she was drunk and at a bus stop on Stirling Road, and Abdul Razak conveyed the news to Tharema who thus made the request out of hope that he can reconcile with Smaelmeeral (who filed for divorce in March that same year). After alighting at the bus stop, Tharema, who saw Smaelmeeral heavily drunk at the bus stop, was angered and assaulted Smaelmeeral at the bus stop and inside the lift of one of the HDB blocks in Stirling Road. After reaching the highest floor (also the 13th level), Tharema carried his ex-wife's body and threw her down from the 13th floor, and it resulted in the death of 32-year-old Smaelmeeral Abdul Aziz.

Tharema denied in court that he intentionally flung Smaelmeeral to her death and said she committed suicide by falling to her death after he assaulted her. Tharema also claimed that the police investigator had led him along and coerced him into admitting to killing his ex-wife, which he did not remember committing but he surrendered out of consideration for his children and friends. Although Tharema's defence counsel sought to have his statements ruled as inadmissible on the grounds that they were made involuntarily, but the trial judge ruled the statements as admissible after a trial-within-a-trial.

Subsequently, Dr Tommy Tan, a private consultant psychiatrist, testified that Tharema was suffering from a delusional disorder that caused him to erroneously believe that he was cursed by black magic, and he acted on his delusional beliefs, and hence it had a substantial impairment of his mental responsibility at the time of the murder, and his huge intake of alcohol prior to the murder also caused his mental state to be influenced by the effects of acute alcohol intoxication. He also inferred to Smaelmeeral's history of attempted suicide, testifying it was possible for Smaelmeeral to kill herself out of despair from her husband's assault. However, Dr Kenneth Koh, the prosecution's psychiatric expert, testified that the intake of alcohol was insufficient for Tharema be intoxicated and not having a clear consciousness of his actions. He also testified that Tharema had no symptoms of a delusional disorder, and he was therefore not suffering from diminished responsibility when he killed Smaelmeeral. Dr Gilbert Lau, the forensic pathologist, stated that the prior assault before the victim's fall to death was so severe that she had already lost a huge amount of blood, and she was weakened so much that she could not have climbed over the 1.2m tall parapet on her own and voluntarily fall to her death. The victim's friends also testified that on the night before her death, Smaelmeeral was in a happy mood and had no suicidal signs, and she also told her childhood friend that she still loved her ex-husband despite having reported him for spousal abuse and filed for divorce.

=== Verdict ===
On 25 May 2009, Justice Tay Yong Kwang delivered his verdict. He found that Tharema's defence of diminished responsibility was ought to be dismissed, because he was still able to retain his consciousness of his actions at the time of the murder, and was not intoxicated by alcohol when he killed Smaelmeeral, and he did not believe Tharema's claims that he was delusional in believing that he was cursed by black magic at the time of the crime. Justice Tay also rejected Tharema's claim that he lost control and acted violently out of anger and killed Smaelmeeral at the sight of Smaelmeeral's drunken state and revealing clothing, which he stated was not a classic case of sudden or grave provocation, because he had argued with Smaelmeeral on many previous occasions regarding this and his acts of violence were consistent with Tharema's short temper. He also found that by bringing his ex-wife into the lift and assaulted her out of the public eye, meaning he was still aware of his actions and he already was aware that Smaelmeeral was drinking before he went to Stirling Road, and he would have 20 minutes to finally calm down by the time he walked from the bus stop to the lift.

After rejecting Tharema's defences, Justice Tay concluded that by flinging his ex-wife down to her death on purpose, Tharema had the intent to cause her death, or alternatively, cause her to sustain bodily injuries that were sufficient in the ordinary course of nature to cause death, and this fulfilled the requirements to return with a verdict of murder in Tharema's case. As such, 40-year-old Tharema Vejayan Govindasamy was found guilty of murder, and sentenced to death by hanging. Prior to 2013, Singaporean law permitted the death penalty as the mandatory punishment for murder upon an offender's conviction.

Tharema was reportedly calm when the death sentence was pronounced in court, but his family members and friends were distraught at the verdict. It was reported that even after two years since their mother's death, Tharema's two children, who were placed under the care of a relative, were kept in the dark about their mother's death.

== Tharema's fate ==
After he was sentenced to death, Tharema personally wrote an obituary dedicated to Smaelmeeral while on death row and with his appeal process still ongoing. In the obituary, Tharema reminisced about the moments of happiness he had with Smaelmeeral and their two children, and the happier times where he and Smaelmeeral loved each other before their divorce. Tharema also wrote that his ex-wife had suffered a lot with him and he hoped that in the after-life, after his death sentence was carried out, his soul could reunite with Smaelmeeral's and his hope to see and hear her again, and he still loved her despite what he had done.

On 27 September 2010, Tharema's appeal against his conviction and sentence was dismissed by the Court of Appeal. Although Tharema stated that his ex-wife died due to suicide, one of the judges V K Rajah dismissed Tharema's claim as "fanciful". The appellate court also cited in their oral grounds of decision that in contrast to defence lawyer Wendell Wong's argument, Smaelmeeral could not have chosen to kill herself after Tharema's assault on her since her injuries were serious and she could not have alone got up to the 13th floor and climbed over the 1.2m parapet before her fall to death.

With his death sentence upheld, Tharema Vejayan Govindasamy remained on death row at Changi Prison for murdering his ex-wife Smaelmeeral Abdul Aziz for another year before he was hanged sometime in early 2011. Based on prison statistics, Tharema was one of the four people (the others included two drug traffickers and one convicted murderer) put to death during the year 2011, and the last execution of that year occurred in July 2011, before the Singapore government enacted a moratorium on all remaining 35 death sentences, conducting a year-long review of the capital punishment laws before the government passed a new law to allow judges in Singapore to sentence murderers to either life in prison or death for cases that never carried the intention to cause death. Tharema was not one of the seven convicted murderers remaining alive on death row as of 2013 when their cases were reviewed for potential re-sentencing.

== Aftermath ==
In 2012, one year after Tharema was executed, the Stirling Road murder case was re-enacted by Singaporean crime show In Cold Blood, and it aired as the first episode of the show's second season. The names of Tharema and Smaelmeeral were changed to Vijayan and Mona out of dramatic purposes and to protect their identities.

In November 2023, another Singaporean crime show Inside Crime Scene re-enacted the Stirling Road murder case, and the re-adaptation aired as the third episode of the show's second season; the episode had a second segment which also featured the Adrian Lim murders of 1981.

== See also ==
- Capital punishment in Singapore
- List of major crimes in Singapore
