= Murder of Chia Lap Lai =

1994 case of a youth murdered in a gang-related attack

Chia Lap Lai
- Chia Lap Lai, the 15-year-old victim
- Born: Chia Lap Lai; 1979; Singapore
- Died: 5 January 1994 (aged 15); Teban Gardens, Singapore
- Cause of death: Murdered
- Education: Secondary Three at Yusof Ishak Secondary School (incomplete due to his death)
- Known for: Murder victim

On 5 January 1994 at Teban Gardens, Singapore, 15-year-old Chia Lap Lai (Chinese: 谢立来; pinyin: Xiè Lìlái; Pe̍h-ōe-jī: Chiā Li̍p-lâi) was killed by a group of three youths in a gang-related attack. Chia was a gang member who had left his gang and joined a rival gang. The attackers, Ng Beng Kiat (Chinese: 黄明杰; pinyin: Huáng Míngjié; Pe̍h-ōe-jī: N̂g Bêng-kia̍t), Allan Ong Chee Hoe (Chinese: 王志和; pinyin: Wáng Zhìhé; Pe̍h-ōe-jī: Ông Chì-hô) and Kyaneth Soo Kian Fong (Chinese: 徐建丰; pinyin: Xú Jiànfēng; Pe̍h-ōe-jī: Sû Kiàn-hong; Pha̍k-fa-sṳ: Chhì Kian-fûng ), all 17, were members of Chia's original gang who wanted to punish Chia for switching allegiances. All three attackers were detained at The President's Pleasure as they were below 18 years of age at the time of the incident.

== Background ==
The neighbourhood of Teban Gardens was controlled by two gangs, namely Pak Hai Tong and Tiong Meng Kok. Chia was originally a member of Tiong Meng Kok, but left to join Pak Hai Tong a few months before he was killed. Ng Beng Kiat, Allan Ong Chee Hoe and Kyaneth Soo Kian Fong were members of Tiong Meng Kok.

According to gang members in the area, the gangs rarely fought; as long as a "code of ethics" was upheld, there would be peace, however poaching members from each other's gangs was not tolerated.

== Attack ==
On the evening of 5 January 1994 at about 9.30 pm, several members of Tiong Meng Kok were playing basketball in Teban Gardens when they saw Chia walking alone to Block 34 where he lived. Three of the members, Ng, Ong and Soo, armed with bamboo poles, followed Chia and attacked him. One of Chia's friends saw the three and suspecting they wanted to attack Chia, attempted to warn him about them, however Chia continued walking on. They followed him into the lift of Block 34 where they attacked him with the bamboo poles. Chia was taken to hospital but died of a fractured skull.

After the attack, the three youth hid in the flat of one of their girlfriends for several nights, then went to an abandoned house in Yishun, before fleeing to Malaysia. While in Malaysia, they were treated badly by the local gang who took them in, often starving them. In August that year, Ng's parents managed to persuade him to return to Singapore and surrender himself to the police. However, Ong and Soo remained on the run. Ong would only be arrested in November 1998, nearly five years after the attack, with Soo surrendering himself to the police two months later.

== Trial of Ng, Ong and Soo ==
=== Trial of Ng Beng Kiat ===
On 6 March 1995, Ng Beng Kiat stood trial for the murder of Chia Lap Lai. The prosecution was led by Deputy Public Prosecutor (DPP) Lee Sing Lit, Ng was represented by defence lawyer Peter Yap, and the trial judge was Justice T. S. Sinnathuray.

Justice Sinnathuray found Ng guilty of murder and sentenced him to detention at the President's Pleasure (TPP). He rejected Ng's defence that he never intended to kill Chia and it had started from a sudden fight.

Just before Justice Sinnathuray read his verdict, Ng made the unusual request of delaying the verdict until the following Monday, as none of Ng's family members were present in court, and he wanted his mother to come to court on Monday to hear the verdict. Justice Sinnathuray rejected the request, saying that although he could sympathise with Ng that he had no family members present in court, he had already arrived at his verdict and there was no purpose in delaying it.

=== Trial of Allan Ong and Kyaneth Soo ===
In April 1999, five years and three months after Chia's murder, High Court judge Justice M. P. H. Rubin found both Ong and Soo guilty of murder. While delivering his judgement, the judge stated that the attack on Chia was premeditated and the duo, together with Ng, had carried it out with ill-feeling and vindictiveness, citing the viciousness of the crime. However, like Ng, both Ong and Soo were not sentenced to death as they were both aged below 18 when they killed Chia. As such, Justice Rubin ordered both Ong and Soo to be detained under TPP.

== Aftermath ==
After the fatal attack on Chia Lap Lai, police began to clamp down on gang activities in the Teban Gardens area. In a Straits Times article dated April 1995, several residents and stall-owners in the area mentioned that the old gangs continued to hang out in the area but no longer created trouble.

Allan Ong and Kyaneth Soo would spend about 13 years and six months in prison, until 2012 when both of them appealed to the President Tony Tan for clemency. President Tony Tan, acting on the advice of the Cabinet, approved their appeals on account of their good behaviour in prison and allowed the two of them to regain their freedom and rejoin society.

In an interview with a Chinese-language newspaper in 2018, Soo mentioned that during his first four years in prison, he racked up numerous bad records by fighting, swearing and smoking, and was put in solitary confinement many times. However, he eventually realised that if he continued to cause trouble, he would not have a chance at being released from prison one day. This made him decide to change. He sat for exams and took up jobs in the prison, earning him a better impression in the eyes of the prison officers. While speaking about his past, he hoped that society would be more tolerating of ex-offenders, citing that even though some may be recalcitrant and persist with their criminal ways, there are others who genuinely want to reform and become better persons. While in prison, Soo had also met "Z", the teenage killer who was hired by Anthony Ler to kill his wife in 2001. "Z", like Soo and Ong, was similarly also convicted of murder but detained under TPP due to his age. Soo described "Z" as very diligent as he had read all the books in the prison library.

Soo also mentioned that he had come from a broken family. His mother had suffered domestic violence and left home, and he did not feel any love from his father and elder brother, which led to him going astray. In 2003, with some influence from a fellow inmate, Soo decided to write a letter to his father admitting his fault. His father replied very quickly and came to the prison to visit him, meeting for the first time after eleven and a half years; Soo broke down upon seeing his father, and they were able to reconcile and repair their relationship.

After his release, Soo got married and had a child in 2017, and started a karaoke studio and restaurant in 2018.

Four months after the fatal attack, Chia Lap Lai's Murder case was re-enacted by Singaporean crime show Crimewatch and aired on television in May 1994

== See also ==
- The President's Pleasure (Singapore)
- List of major crimes in Singapore
