= Commonwealth double murders =

2019 high-profile murders in Singapore

- Date: 27 October 2019; 7 years ago
- Location: Commonwealth, Singapore
- Motive: Undetermined, but crime committed under influence of drugs while of unsound mind
- Deaths: See Keng Keng; Lee Soh Mui
- Suspects: Gabriel Lien Goh

The Commonwealth double murders were the two family-related murders of the convict's mother and grandmother, which occurred on 27 October 2019 in Commonwealth, Singapore. The killer, 22-year-old Gabriel Lien Goh, is alleged to have argued with his mother Lee Soh Mui (aged 56) over unknown issues and stabbed his mother and his grandmother See Keng Keng (aged 90) to death. Goh was charged with the murders of his grandmother and mother and currently, he is detained indefinitely under the President's Pleasure due to him being of drug-induced unsound mind at the time of the offences.

== The killings ==
On the night of 27 October 2019, at around 7.24 pm, residents were alerted to a commotion happening at the ground floor of a HDB flat block somewhere at Commonwealth, with a group of people shouting and screaming. According to first-hand accounts, earlier at one of the block’s seventh-floor units, the female owner of the unit was apparently arguing with her adult son for unknown issues, before the son allegedly killed her. He then chased after both his grandmother and maid who were both escaping from the flat, and the grandmother was caught and fatally assaulted.

The maid, who was a 32-year-old Javanese married with children back in Java, hid somewhere at the third-floor and received help from a resident.

After the members of the public from the void deck restrained the suspect, they called the police who arrested the suspect, and he was charged with murder the next day. The two elderly men, whom the young man allegedly assaulted before he was restrained, suffered the worst injuries and were hospitalized at National University Hospital. The deaths of both the mother and grandmother, who were believed to be aged in their fifties and nineties respectively, were classified as murder.

== Indictment and remand ==
On 28 October 2019, the 22-year-old suspect, identified as Gabriel Lien Goh, who was still suffering from fresh injuries, was taken to court where he was officially charged with the murder of his 56-year-old mother Lee Soh Mui. He was ordered to be warded for psychiatric observation and assessment for three weeks at Changi Prison's Complex Medical Centre. Goh’s older brother and eleven of his relatives and friends were present at the court but were too distraught to speak to the media.

On 18 November 2019, Goh was brought back to court again, where the prosecution brought up a second murder charge, this time for the death of his 90-year-old grandmother See Keng Keng.

On 25 November 2019, Goh was brought back to the crime scene within the following week to re-enact the crime.

== Background ==
Gabriel Lien Goh (吴立恩 Wú Lìēn), the younger of two sons, was born in 1997. He has an older brother (born 1992 or 1993) who has been married since 2019. His mother Lee Soh Mui (李素梅 Lǐ Sūméi) was a school teacher and librarian who headed a 35-year teaching career, including 17 years at Queenstown Secondary School. Goh’s father was a doctorate at Massachusetts Institute of Technology (MIT) who married Lee in 1990, but he died in 1999 due to an illness when Goh was only two years old. Goh’s brother studied computer studies at a university.

After the death of her husband, Lee, who was 36 years old back then, single-handedly raised Goh and his older brother, and she also took on the responsibility of taking care of her elderly mother See Keng Keng (施庆庆 Shī Qìngqìng), (Note: See's Chinese name is alternatively translated to 许卿龚 Xǚ Qīnggōng) and never sought the help of her brother, sister, and other relatives. Lee was therefore a caring mother and filial daughter to those who knew her prior to her murder. Her caring mentor figure was highly regarded by her former students, who published tributes on Facebook upon receiving news of her death. After her husband passed on, Lee would still keep in touch with his family and bring her kids to visit the family during Chinese New Year. She was also a member of the Down Syndrome Association (Singapore).

According to his relatives, Goh and his brother were known to be obedient. Goh remained living with his mother, grandmother and maid after his brother married and moved out in July 2019, three months before he killed the former two.

Goh was educated up to at least a polytechnic diploma. He was also an enthusiastic Muay Thai practitioner and had won a medal before, and became the club’s vice president while he was still completing his three-year polytechnic education in Ngee Ann Polytechnic. He also opened up an Instagram account to post photos of his fighting feats.

A news report also revealed in late January 2020 that four months prior to the alleged murders, Goh was a victim of a past assault incident. Goh was apparently assaulted by at least three men (including a security guard) after he finished drinking at a nightclub with two friends. One of Goh’s assailants, 20-year-old Muhammad Raushan bin Nishan, was found guilty of voluntarily causing hurt, and was sentenced to reformative training for the crime in the same month.

== Trial of Gabriel Lien Goh ==
=== Goh's district court trial for drug offences ===
On 11 November 2021, Gabriel Goh, who remained in remand for the murders, was first brought to court for a total of six charges of illegal possession and consumption of drugs. Goh pleaded guilty to consumption of lysergide (LSD), as well as one count each of LSD and cannabis possession. Police investigations revealed that Goh had started to consume drugs in December 2018 and they also found packets of drugs in his possession at his home. Goh also started a blog which questioned why the use of marijuana is not legalised in Singapore.

A district court of Singapore sentenced Goh to 22 months’ imprisonment for these charges, and the sentence was backdated to the date of Goh's arrest two years earlier. Still, Goh remained behind bars as he had not yet been trialed for the murders of both his mother and grandmother.

=== Goh's High Court trial for murder ===
The first day of Goh's murder trial was scheduled to take place at the High Court on 23 September 2022, with High Court judge Valerie Thean being appointed to hear his case. Goh was also set to be represented by leading criminal lawyer Eugene Thuraisingam as his defence counsel during the court proceedings.

On the first day of his trial, 25-year-old Gabriel Lien Goh, whose murder charges were reduced to culpable homicide not amounting to murder, refused to plead guilty to his offences charged. However, the prosecution sought an acquittal on the culpable homicidal charges against Goh, as the psychiatric report showed that Goh suffered from acute hallucinogen intoxication at the time of the killings and hence was of substantial unsound mind when he committed the murders of his mother and grandmother, since his consumption of LSD caused him to experience illusions, hallucinations and paranoid delusions at the time of the offences. Goh also stated he cannot recall on how he killed his grandmother despite accepting that he was responsible for his mother's death.

Goh was thus acquitted of his charges and the judge Valerie Thean sentenced him to indefinite detention under the President's Pleasure, a type of sentence given to mentally unsound offender's charged with whichever crimes (including murder) and such a detention meant the offender will be detained indefinitely until such time he was fit for release. Goh was later detained at Changi Prison Complex medical centre after the end of his trial.

== Aftermath ==
In May 2024, Law Minister K Shanmugam, who touched on the topic of the death penalty during a parliamentary session, stated that the death penalty remains part of Singapore's war on drugs to deter drug trafficking and decrease the rate of drug consumption. The case of Gabriel Lien Goh was cited as a high-profile cases involving drugs.

== See also ==
- Capital punishment in Singapore
- List of major crimes in Singapore
