= Murder of Manap Sarlip =

2007 contract killing of a disc jockey in Singapore

Manap Sarlip
- Manap Sarlip, the disc jockey murdered outside his flat
- Born: Manap bin Sarlip; 30 June 1978; Singapore
- Died: July 1, 2007 (aged 29); Whampoa, Singapore
- Cause of death: Murdered
- Occupation: Disc jockey
- Known for: Murder victim
- Children: 2

On 1 July 2007, 29-year-old Manap Sarlip was found murdered outside his flat at Whampoa, Singapore. The police investigations led to the arrest of the killer, 17-year-old Muhammad Nasir Abdul Aziz, and Manap's 24-year-old wife Aniza Essa, who ordered and manipulated Nasir to kill Manap. Both of them were charged with murder and abetment of murder respectively. It was revealed that Aniza, who was in an unhappy marriage with Manap due to his abusive behaviour, had an affair with Nasir, who fell deeply in love with her; therefore, she instigated Nasir to help her kill her husband under the pretext that they would end up together without him. With her depression taken into account, Aniza was sentenced to nine years' imprisonment after pleading guilty to manslaughter. As for Nasir, he was found guilty of murder but was imprisoned indefinitely under the President's Pleasure since his age of 17 prevented him from receiving the death penalty under Singaporean law.

== Background ==
=== Aniza Essa ===
Aniza Essa, born in 1982, studied up to Secondary 3 and dropped out. In September 2001, at the age of 19, she married her husband, Manap bin Sarlip; they had one son in 2006. Manap's eldest child from his first marriage, also a son, stayed with them. Manap worked as a disco jockey in a discotheque; he had been imprisoned for 21 months for desertion of national service, which he had been serving in the Singapore Civil Defence Force (SCDF). The marriage between Aniza and Manap was unhappy; Manap was abusive towards his wife, who had to work two jobs during his absence to support herself and the two children. The abuse had gotten worse after Manap's release from jail on 15 August 2006. By 2006, Aniza was working at a pub; there, she met a 16-year-old Nasir, who would eventually become her lover.

=== Muhammad Nasir Abdul Aziz ===
Aniza's colleague and lover, Muhammad Nasir Abdul Aziz, was born in September 1990; he had an older brother named Muhammad Khamil. Nasir's mother abandoned his family while he was an infant, with his parents divorcing when he was two months old. Nasir was raised by his aunt during his childhood. He left school in Secondary 3 to work and support his family; he took care of his father, who was suffering from poor health, and helped tend the father's shop. In 2006, Nasir met Aniza at the pub she was working at, which he frequented; the two began an affair after he became a bartender in February 2007. He was said to have fallen deeply in love with her, whom he regarded as the "most beautiful" woman he had seen.

== Murder plot and Manap's death ==
By mid June 2007, Aniza could no longer tolerate her husband's abuse, and she occasionally would confide to Nasir about the unhappiness and depression she suffered under Manap's abuse. Although Nasir advised Aniza to divorce her husband, Aniza stated she was afraid of Manap coming to harass her after the divorce and she also stated Manap would never consent to her request to divorce him.

Eventually, Aniza formulated a plan to commit the murder of her husband, and she told Nasir to help her kill Manap. She also threatened to leave Nasir and entrust the task to her former boyfriend, should Nasir reject the offer, which she described as the only one chance for Nasir to show his love for Aniza. Afraid of losing Aniza, Nasir agreed to do the task. Initially, Nasir made the first attempt to assassinate Manap but after he saw a neighbour approaching Manap nearby his flat, Nasir had to abandon the task, and therefore, after further discussion with Aniza, Nasir contacted a friend nicknamed "Saigon" to help him find a hired professional killer to help do the job, but by the deadline of 29 June 2007 agreed upon by Nasir and Aniza, Saigon did not find one and he did not respond to Nasir's messages or phone call.

After failing to find a hired hitman to go after Manap, Nasir was faced with Aniza's insistence to commit the murder, and he promised to do so personally by the end of the month. On the night of 1 July 2007, Nasir wore a helmet and armed himself with a knife, and he waited outside Manap's matrimonial flat in Whampoa. When Manap returned home from work, Nasir wielded the knife to attack Manap and stabbed him several times on the neck. Manap, who met Nasir before and knew him, reportedly spoke in Malay, "Apa salah aku pada kau?", which was translated to mean "What wrong have I done to you?". Nasir did not reply and left the scene, but before he could take the lift at another level, he heard Manap's forlorn groans and cries in pain, and fearing that his sounds would alert the neighbours and he would not die from his wounds, Nasir returned to the outside of Manap's flat and stabbed him on the chest, thus leading to the death of 29-year-old Manap Sarlip. According to a forensic pathologist's report, Manap had been stabbed nine times on the neck and chest, and one of the knife wounds on Manap's chest was sufficient in the ordinary course of nature to cause death.

After Nasir killed Manap, he left the scene, and subsequently, Manap's corpse was discovered that same day and eventually, Nasir and Aniza were both arrested as suspects behind his death.

== Investigations ==
On 3 July 2007, following some police investigations, both Aniza and Nasir were arrested and charged with abetment of murder and murder respectively. However, Nasir was 16 years and ten months old at the time of the murder, and hence if found guilty, he would not face the death penalty but be imprisoned indefinitely at the President's Pleasure (TPP) instead, because minors who were aged below 18 cannot be executed. As for 24-year-old Aniza herself, she would be sentenced to hang if she was found guilty of abetting Manap's murder. Aniza's son reportedly did not wish to see his father's body. Subsequently, in March 2008, both Aniza and Nasir were ordered to stand trial on a later date.

During police interrogation, Aniza blamed Nasir for having murdered her husband and claimed he plotted it all along. However, the police believed in Nasir's confession, in which he admitted to stabbing Manap to death under the instigation and manipulation of Aniza, whom he loved dearly and was afraid of losing her if he did not kill Manap. Nasir was reportedly angered and felt betrayed when he heard that Aniza falsely accused him as the mastermind and pinned the whole blame on him. Nasir's family were genuinely shocked to hear that he had been arrested for murder, and were confused and in pain over his actions. Nasir's family also stated they were unaware that he had a relationship with a married woman all along before his arrest.

The case of Manap's murder happened on the same date as the Stirling Road murder in Queenstown, which involved an odd-job worker throwing his ex-wife down from the 13th floor of a HDB block and caused her to die from a fall. The perpetrator, Tharema Vejayan Govindasamy, was found guilty of murdering his ex-wife Smaelmeeral Abdul Aziz and given the death penalty in May 2009.

== Trial of Aniza Essa ==
=== Conviction and sentencing ===
Aniza Essa
- Aniza Essa, who was convicted of abetting her husband's killing
- Born: Aniza binte Essa; 1982 (age 43–44); Singapore
- Occupation: Pub waitress (former)
- Spouse: Manap Sarlip (m. 2001; died 2007)
- Children: 1 son and 1 stepson
- Status: Released
- Motive: To escape spousal abuse
- Conviction: Manslaughter (one count)
- Criminal charge: Murder (one count)
- Penalty: Nine years' imprisonment

On 7 April 2008, Aniza was brought to trial at the High Court. By then, the murder charge against Aniza was reduced to a lesser offence of culpable homicide not amounting to murder, equivalent to manslaughter in Singapore's legal terms. The reduction of the murder charge meant that Aniza would not be sentenced to death, but she faced a potential sentence of either life in prison or up to ten years in jail. Her case was heard before Justice Chan Seng Onn for a sentencing trial.

The reduction of Aniza's murder charge was made on the grounds of diminished responsibility. A government psychiatrist found that Aniza was suffering from depression and her condition, which was of moderate severity, substantially impaired her mental responsibility at the time of the crime, and also affected her judgement at the time she planned and executed the murder plot. The domestic abuse which Manap inflicted on Aniza and her financial concerns contributed to her depression, and she also felt a sense of helplessness and it caused her to fail to act positively to prevent Nasir from killing Manap on her behalf.

The prosecution sought the maximum sentence of life imprisonment for Aniza. They cited that Aniza was the mastermind of the murder, and she had ended the life of her husband in a cold-blooded and premeditated manner and even solicited Nasir, who had at all nothing to do with her marital issues, to stab her husband to death, and her conduct was extremely abhorrent and malicious that the emphasis of Aniza's sentence should be placed on the need for retribution and deterrence, to prevent any like-minded offenders from attempting to solicit the murder of their spouses or ex-spouses, and likened the case to that of the infamous-wife-killer Anthony Ler, who was found guilty of soliciting the murder of his wife by a 15-year-old student. On the other hand, Noor Mohamed Marican, Aniza's lawyer, pleaded for leniency and asked the court to not sentence Aniza to not more than ten years' jail, citing her unhappy and abusive marriage and her depression was still manageable with treatment and she would not pose an inherent threat to society.

By the order of Abdul Nasir Amer Hamsah's landmark appeal on 20 August 1997, life imprisonment is to be defined as a term of incarceration lasting the remainder of a convict's natural life, instead of the old definition of life imprisonment as 20 years in prison. The changes to the law was to be applied to future cases that took place after 20 August 1997. Since Aniza committed the crime of abetting manslaughter on 1 July 2007, around nine years and eleven months after the landmark ruling, and if she were to be sentenced to life in prison, Aniza would be imprisoned for the rest of her natural life.

After hearing the submissions, Justice Chan delivered his verdict on sentence. While he agreed that Aniza had psychologically manipulated a minor to commit the murder of her husband in extreme cold blood, he noted that Aniza's conduct was not especially abhorrent enough to warrant the imposition of a life sentence, since the psychiatric reports cited that Aniza's actions were a result of the impairment of her mental responsibility at the time and also affected her judgement, and her depressive episodes originated from the spousal abuse Manap had been inflicting upon her. Justice Chan also considered the sentencing guidelines, finding that Aniza's depression was of moderate severity and could still be treated, and she also showed a low risk of re-offending and could still lead a normal life after her release. He also stated that with a determinate jail term of up to ten years, Aniza, who was now the sole surviving parent of Manap's two children, would at least have a chance to be a better, matured mother and would learn her lesson, and her sons would not have her completely missing from the formative years of their lives. Hence, Justice Chan decided to sentence 25-year-old Aniza Essa to nine years' imprisonment, and backdate her jail term to the date of her arrest in July 2007.

=== Prosecution's appeal and outcome ===
After the sentencing of Aniza, the prosecution filed an appeal against Aniza's nine-year sentence, seeking to increase her jail term from nine years to life. Walter Woon, then Attorney-General of Singapore (who took office in April 2008), had not only directed the prosecution to submit the appeal, but also personally participated in the appeal hearing and argue on behalf of the prosecution. The participation of Woon sent ripples all over the legal community in Singapore and also the public, as this marked the first time in over a decade when an attorney-general in Singapore personally argue a case in court.

During the appeal hearing at the Court of Appeal in July 2008, Woon argued that the original trial judge Chan Seng Onn had placed undue reliance on the mitigation plea of Aniza, and he argued that there was a disparity between the sentences of Nasir and Aniza, because the mastermind Aniza was sentenced to jail for nine years on a manslaughter charge while the accomplice Nasir was indefinitely detained at the President's Pleasure since 2008 on a charge of murder, and unlike Aniza, who would be possibly released on parole after serving two-thirds of her sentence (equivalent to six years), Nasir's sentence was effectively a jail term for a longer period (ranging between ten and 20 years) until he will be assessed suitable for release through a presidential pardon on a later date. Woon argued that given the disparity between their sentences, the larger role played by Aniza was all the more why she deserved to be jailed for life, and also highlighted the various aggravating circumstances of Manap's brutal murder, which started with Aniza's premeditated intent to cause his death and her manipulation of Nasir to do the killing etc. On these above points, Woon argued that Aniza's sentence should be life rather than nine years, and he also asked that the sentencing guidelines set by the Hodgson criteria should be abolished to lower the threshold of life imprisonment, in order to allow judges to have more discretion to impose life sentences on offenders who were not suitable under the criteria but deserved to face a life term for their respective offences. Earlier, Justice Chan relied on that criteria to decide that Aniza should not get life on account of her moderately-severe psychiatric condition despite the inhumane nature of Manap's murder.

The verdict was given on 20 April 2009 by the Court of Appeal. The three-judge panel, consisting of Chief Justice Chan Sek Keong, and two Judges of Appeal Andrew Phang and V. K. Rajah, agreed with Woon's assertions that Aniza had shared a higher culpability than Nasir with regards to the murder of her husband, and conceded that Aniza's sentence of nine years and Nasir's indefinite detention posed a disproportionate disparity in terms of sentencing, but they found that Justice Chan was correct to follow the rules of the Hodgson criteria in deciding on Aniza's sentence, and that his findings on Aniza's psychiatric condition was correct, since Aniza's depression was originated from spousal abuse and could still be addressed with treatment, and the possibility of her committing another crime was low, and hence, it was not erred on Justice Chan's part to impose a sentence that seemed overtly lenient but truthfully appropriate under the law, and they felt that life imprisonment was too harsh for Aniza in view of the circumstances of her case.

The three judges also stated that it cannot be helped that Justice Chan was bound by law to choose between ten years and life for Aniza's sentence of manslaughter, given that the Penal Code was only revised in February 2008 to enable judges to impose jail terms of either life or up to 20 years for manslaughter, and the revision was only effective for future cases but not Aniza's case (which occurred a year before the legal changes). They reiterated that there was a need for caution to impose jail terms of "natural life" on young offenders like Aniza and also to avoid imposing a sentence that may be disproportionately harsh compared to the "manifestly inadequate" ten-year jail term for cases where judges were desirous of sending an offender to jail for longer than ten years but shorter than life.

Therefore, the prosecution's appeal was dismissed by the Court of Appeal, and Aniza's sentence of nine years' imprisonment was upheld and finalized.

== Trial of Muhammad Nasir Abdul Aziz ==
Muhammad Nasir Abdul Aziz
- Muhammad Nasir Abdul Aziz, who pleaded guilty to the murder of Manap
- Born: Muhammad Nasir bin Abdul Aziz; 1 September 1990 (age 36); Singapore
- Occupation: Bartender (former)
- Status: Imprisoned at Changi Prison since 2007
- Motive: Out of love for his victim's wife
- Conviction: Murder (one count)
- Criminal charge: Murder (one count)
- Penalty: Indefinite detention at the President's Pleasure

On 15 April 2008, a week after Aniza pleaded guilty and was sentenced in court, 17-year-old Muhammad Nasir Abdul Aziz officially stood trial at the High Court for one count of murdering Manap bin Sarlip back in July 2007. Although a person facing trial for murder at the High Court was not legally allowed to plead guilty, Nasir was granted an exception and he pleaded guilty to the charge of murder (since he would not be sentenced to death), and did not contest the prosecution's case against him. Nasir was represented by Singapore's best criminal lawyer Subhas Anandan, and the trial was presided by Justice Kan Ting Chiu of the High Court.

During the trial, Nasir was allowed to submit a mitigation plea since he would not face the death penalty for murdering Manap, and this would help him in his periodic review for release after at least ten years of indefinite detention. Anandan raised several points in Nasir's favour, stating that Nasir was deeply in love with Aniza, and was afraid of losing her and hence committed the murder in a moment of folly, as a result of Aniza's manipulation and threats. Nasir himself also expressed regret for his actions, and also wrote a personal letter to the judge, seeking a second chance in life and to show repentance for his actions, and also to reform himself. A psychiatric report by Dr Pavarthy Pathy also revealed that Nasir was remorseful for his actions, and he no longer felt love but anger for Aniza for having used him and wanted "to hurt her".

Justice Kan, who read the letter and heard the defence's mitigation plea, personally addressed Nasir that he understood his feelings and also the defence's points, and he found Nasir's letter "touching", but he reminded Nasir that regardless of the extenuating circumstances in his case, Nasir had to accept the responsibility of his actions since he had killed a man, which Nasir readily understood. On that same day, Justice Kan officially sentenced 17-year-old Muhammad Nasir Abdul Aziz to be imprisoned indefinitely at the President's Pleasure (TPP).

== Aftermath ==
The case of Manap's murder brought shock to the whole of Singapore, as the case shared several similarities with the case of Anthony Ler, who manipulated and threatened a 15-year-old boy to murder his wife Annie Leong in 2001, as Ler wanted to gain sole custody of his daughter and the ownership of their flat. Ler was sentenced to hang for the murder, and executed on 13 December 2002, while the boy was spared the gallows due to his age and served 17 years in prison under the TPP. There were calls for the government to abolish the measure of indefinitely detaining minors under the President's Pleasure.

To date, Nasir was the last underaged criminal convicted of a capital offence to be imprisoned under TPP, due to the abolition of TPP for underaged offenders who commit capital crimes in 2010. He also became the last inmate imprisoned under the TPP as of 2018, due to the release of Anthony Ler's hired killer, who was 15 when he was instigated by Ler to murder Ler's wife and thus served 17 years under the TPP.

In 2009, Subhas Anandan, the former lawyer of Nasir, wrote his first book The Best I Could, and he recorded the case of Nasir inside his book. The book was re-adapted into a two-season television series of the same name in 2014, and the episode featuring Nasir's case aired as the seventh episode of the show's second and final season.

In his book, Anandan compared the case as similar to that of his former client Anthony Ler, who also manipulated a teenager to murder his wife, although the difference was that Ler's accomplice did so for money and was manipulated and threatened with his life, Nasir did so out of love for Aniza and threatened to lose her, and he wrote that it was ridiculous and unfair that his young client Nasir, who was clearly manipulated by Aniza, whom Subhas described as a "manipulative monster" in his book, had to pay a very heavy price for what he had done while Aniza herself, as the mastermind, escaped with a light punishment, reflecting his sympathy for the youth and his disappointment over the lack of compassion from the law and prosecutors, who refused to agree to his requests to reduce Nasir's murder charge in light of his youth and other mitigating factors of the case.

Anandan also wrote in his book that after Nasir's sentencing, he confided to Anandan his intention to continue his studies in prison, and Anandan agreed to help Nasir to arrange for him to take his O-levels and A-levels behind bars; some excerpts of Nasir's handwritten letter was reproduced in the memoir. Anandan also noted that the trial judge Kan Ting Chiu was sympathetic towards Nasir and wanted to show leniency, but in Justice Kan's words, his "hands were tied" and he was bound by law to sentence Nasir to prison at the President's Pleasure and had no choice. Anandan also reflected on Nasir's case and hoped that the criminal law of Singapore can be more compassionate for cases with circumstances similar to Nasir's, because he personally felt that the prosecution tend to view compassion as a weakness and never exercise their prerogative for cases like Nasir's.

Singaporean crime show Crimewatch re-enacted the Manap Sarlip murder case and it aired in April 2010.

In 2011, Singaporean crime show In Cold Blood re-enacted the case and it aired as the 12th and final episode of the show's first season. In the episode itself, Nasir's name was changed to Nazri and Aniza's name was changed to Sarina to protect their privacies and for dramatic purposes. Manap's identity was also changed for a similar purpose as well.

== See also ==
- Capital punishment in Singapore
- List of major crimes in Singapore
- The President's Pleasure (Singapore)
