= Anthony Ler =

Convicted murderer executed in Singapore

Anthony Ler Wee Teang
- Born: c. 1967; Singapore
- Died: 13 December 2002 (aged 35); Changi Prison, Singapore
- Cause of death: Execution by hanging
- Status: Executed
- Conviction: Abetment of murder
- Penalty: Death (5 December 2001)
- Accomplices: "Z" (detained indefinitely for murder; released on 2 November 2018)

Details
- Victims: Annie Leong Wai Mun, 30 (dead)
- Date: 1 May 2001–14 May 2001
- Country: Singapore
- Date apprehended: 19 May 2001

Anthony Ler Wee Teang
- Traditional Chinese: 呂偉添
- Simplified Chinese: 吕伟添
Transcriptions
Standard Mandarin
- Hanyu Pinyin: lǚ wěitiān
Yue: Cantonese
- Jyutping: leoi5 wai5 tim1

Anthony Ler Wee Teang (Note: His full name is addressed as Ler Wee Teang Anthony in the Court of Appeal verdict.) (c. 1967 – 13 December 2002) was a Singaporean convicted murderer who hired a youth to murder his wife, 30-year-old real-estate agent Annie Leong Wai Mun, who was in the midst of a divorce with him. Ler's motive was to become the sole owner of their flat and to gain custody of their four-year-old daughter. Ler approached five youths and offered them a reward of S$100,000 to kill Leong. A 15-year-old boy whom Ler had known for five years accepted the offer. Ler threatened and manipulated the youth to carry out the deed. After several failed attempts, the youth fatally stabbed Leong.

The boy was not named to protect his identity since he was a minor. Court documents and media instead referred to the boy as "Z". Anthony Ler was convicted of masterminding the murder, and was hanged after he lost his appeal and clemency plea. As Z was too young to be executed, he was instead detained indefinitely. He served nearly 17 years in prison before being granted clemency by president and conditionally released on 2 November 2018.

The murder case was adapted into a documentary and an episode of a true crime TV series. The memoir of Subhas Anandan, Ler's lawyer, was subsequently adapted into another true crime series and published in Guilty As Charged: 25 Crimes That Have Shaken Singapore Since 1965, a collection of crime stories by The Straits Times.

== Early life of Anthony Ler ==
=== Childhood, education and marriage ===
Anthony Ler Wee Teang (Chinese: 吕伟添; pinyin: Lǚ Wěitiān), who was born sometime in 1967, was the youngest of four children. It was stated that he had an unhappy childhood, and his parents divorced when he was young. Ler, who was not close to his two brothers and one sister, completed his primary and secondary education at River Valley English School and Thomson Secondary School respectively before moving on to study in a polytechnic. However, Ler dropped out in his first year after his father refused to continue paying for his education. It was said that Ler was an average student in terms of academic performance.

After completing his mandatory two-year National Service and pursuing a subsequent five-year army career, Anthony Ler established several businesses but all ended in bankruptcy and failure. At the time of his arrest, Ler was working as a graphic designer. Ler first met his wife Annie Leong Wai Mun (Note: Her full name was also spelt as Annie Leong Wai Muen) (Chinese: 梁慧敏; pinyin: Liáng Huìmǐn) in a church when he was 19 years old. At that time, Leong was 15 years old. They later began a relationship, which lasted for five years before their marriage in 1995. The couple's first and only child, a daughter, was born on 13 April 1997.

=== Deterioration of marriage and divorce proceedings ===
Ler was unfaithful to his wife. He had an affair with a woman named Belinda Ho Wei Lynn, who later found out that Ler was a husband and father. Later, Ler even allowed Ho into his flat to live with him and his wife and daughter. Leong subsequently found out about the affair between her husband and Ho. This affair was riddled with the financial problems racked up from Ler's failed business ventures, and ended three and a half years later. This affair became the main factor in Leong's decision to separate from him. Ler also had an affair with another woman named Marilyn Tan Su Fen, with whom he also engaged in business. This business ended in financial trouble, as did their affair.

Apart from the affairs her husband engaged in, Leong had to also cope with her husband's financial difficulties by using their savings to settle his debts. She had quit her job from the bank to help her husband to set up a business, but returned to work after their daughter was born. In October 1999, Leong, together with their daughter, left her husband to live with her mother. In August 2000, Ler nearly faced bankruptcy because of a failing publishing business. As a result, he attempted suicide by overdosing on sleeping pills and was hospitalised for this. Leong returned to help him, and for Ler, it was a sign that their marriage could be reconciled. However, that was not to be, as Leong began to file for divorce in February 2001, and was pending custody of their daughter. It was also informally agreed that Ler would visit their daughter on the weekends.

== Contract killing of Annie Leong ==
=== Plotting of wife's murder ===
Ler's wife Annie Leong Wai Mun

The debt-ridden Ler knew that given his precarious financial situation he would be unlikely to gain custody of his daughter, believing he did not have the ability to raise her well due to the substantial debts incurred from his failed businesses; another factor was the pending sale of their flat. Ler began to contemplate murdering his wife to gain custody of their daughter and the full ownership of his flat, intending that his debts would ultimately be paid off from the proceeds promised by the sale of the flat.

=== First move and recruitment ===
Anthony Ler began in February 2001 by befriending a group of five teenage boys who had gathered outside a McDonald's restaurant in Pasir Ris. Ler acted as a mentor to them, and went on meeting them a few times. After they first met, Ler asked the boys if they dared to kill people and when one of them asked how much he was willing to pay, Ler asked them to name their price. One of the boys, a 15-year-old secondary school student whom Ler had known for five years, replied S$1 million; another boy, a 16-year-old school drop-out named Gavin Ng Jin Wei (Chinese: 黄敬伟; pinyin: Huáng Jìngwěi), said S$100,000; a third boy named Seah Tze Howe (Chinese: 佘子豪; pinyin: Shé Ziháo) said S$100; the others gave unknown prices. Ler agreed to Gavin's price, and asked them to name a target. That was when Ler expressed that his target would be his wife, whom he said he hated for not allowing him to visit his daughter frequently and everything else. He said he would pay that amount to any boy who dared to do it. All the boys perceived it as a joke.

In the first week of May 2001, Lee again met up with Gavin and the 15-year-old boy (who was also Gavin's childhood friend of 11 years). Ler then once again brought up the issue of wanting his wife dead, and asked if Gavin would do it, even asking him to kill his wife by covering her mouth with one hand and slit her throat with a knife from behind. It was then Gavin realised that Ler was serious about killing Leong. Gavin was later brought to Ler's flat to practice by using a newspaper and knife, and being shown the photos of Leong and their daughter. Gavin later talked to a 14-year-old female friend (who was not named in the media due to her aged below 16), about this incident, and he decided to back out after she told him to not do the job. Gavin tried to warn his 15-year-old friend to not do the job.

Another youth, 22-year-old Seah Tze Howe, was approached by Ler to kill his wife. Like Gavin, Tze Howe also realised that Ler was serious about it when he was invited to Ler's flat one night, where he was offered $100,000 to commit the murder. Ler said he would be selling the flat and use the money from the proceeds to pay him. Tze Howe then suggested Ler to hire a professional killer to carry out the murder. Ler later told him that he could not find anyone to do it.

Similarly, the remaining two of the five youths, 19-year-old Kong Ka Cheong (Chinese: 江家聪; pinyin: Jiāng Jiācōng) and 17-year-old Vickneswaran Krishnan, felt that Ler was joking and they were disturbed at Ler's constant mentioning of the issue. Vickneswaran, who is also known as Vick to his friends, told the court that, "I found it strange that he should mention the subject of killing his wife every time we met. I thought he was crazy". On the other hand, the 15-year-old, who was described as simple-minded and being gullible by Gavin, agreed with Ler's requests to kill his wife.

=== The first failed attempts on Annie Leong's life ===
The first attempt was on 10 May 2001. The youth was brought to Hougang Avenue 9 by Anthony Ler, who told him to go to Block 923, to the flat where Annie Leong lived. On the instructions of Ler, the youth wore a helmet to prevent facial identification, and armed himself with a long steak knife given to him by Ler. After seeing a woman alighting the taxi, the youth, from what he said in his police statements, asked Ler by phone about Leong's facial description. After receiving Ler's description of Leong, which roughly matched the description of the woman whom the youth seen, the boy began to make his move but he missed Leong after reaching the fourth floor (the floor where Leong lived). Later, the boy saw Leong coming out with her daughter to go to the playground. The 15-year-old, upon seeing the girl, could not bring himself to attack Leong in the presence of the little girl despite Ler's insistence that he do so.

The second attempt was on 11 May the next day. However, the youth had second thoughts and considered backing out of the plan. Before he could even raise a finger, he placed the helmet on a parked motorcycle in a nearby carpark. Just then, a phone call from Anthony Ler came, and this compelled him into obeying Ler's orders to carry out the killing again. Once again, by the time he reached the lift lobby of the fourth floor, he missed Leong. Later, the youth saw her, together with Anthony Ler and their daughter, playing in the playground. It was then the boy realised that he did not want to murder Annie Leong.

=== Accomplice's reluctance ===
After the second failed attempt, an angry Ler refused to let the boy back out of the plan. It was then, the boy stated, Ler threatened to take his life if he did not help kill Ler's wife. Not only that, Ler even went as far as to make a threat on the lives of the boy's parents and two other siblings. For the next two days, the boy did not go visit Ler because he wanted to celebrate Mother's Day with his mother.

On his visit to Anthony Ler's home on 13 May, the boy was given a Japanese samurai sword as a gift from Ler, and the boy liked it. Ler told him he wanted the boy to use the sword to kill Leong. The boy refused to do it and asked to return the weapon to Ler, who in response, told him that he would use the sword to kill him if so. Still not wanting to do the deed, after he went home with the sword, the boy then stayed out for a whole day after going on a fishing session and spent the night in his girlfriend's flat in Tampines. (Note: In the High Court verdict, the boy's girlfriend was addressed as Joanne Chia (or Janelle Chia), but it might not be her real name.)

The boy deliberately avoided phone calls from Ler until much later, when he answered a call and Ler told him to go to Hougang. The boy then went to Ler's flat with a steak knife given to him by Ler, and his school textbook (to create an excuse that he had been out studying for his undergoing exams). On arrival, they prepared for and practised the killing, with Ler telling the boy specifically where he should stab Annie Leong with the knife. After they left the flat, the final and fatal attempt began.

=== 14 May 2001: Murder of Annie Leong ===
Murder of Annie Leong
- Date: 14 May 2001; 25 years ago
- Location: Hougang, Singapore
- Motive: To gain full ownership of the Lers' flat and custody of daughter
- Deaths: 1
- Suspects: • Anthony Ler Wee Teang • "Z", the 15-year-old hired killer

Taking with him some papers, Anthony Ler went to visit his wife late at night, at about 11:00 p.m. and asked to meet out in the playground with their daughter. After they met up, Ler asked Leong to sign some papers regarding the unsettled mortgage of their flat, in which they would ask for the mortgage to be settled in monthly installments. Leong agreed to, and asked Ler if he had a pen. Ler said no. Hence, Leong decided to go up to her mother's flat to get a pen, while Ler stayed behind to accompany their four-year-old daughter in the playground. Unknown to Leong, she was lured into a lethal trap set by her own husband.

The 15-year-old youth, who was in the ground floor watching the family of three in secrecy, upon seeing Leong about to go up on the lift, made his move as instructed by Ler. He quickly ran up the stairs and reached the fourth floor on time to see Leong stepping out of the lift. From behind, the teenager immediately set upon Leong, covering the screaming woman's mouth with a red cloth on one hand while wielding the knife on the other hand to stab Leong on the neck and chest. After that, the murderer fled the scene, leaving a mortally wounded Leong staggering to the outside of her mother's flat. Leong knocked on her mother's door and said that she had been stabbed before collapsing in front of her horrified mother and brother.

At the same time, Ler heard his wife's screams from downstairs and quickly, together with his daughter, got up to his mother-in-law's flat (with the knowledge that the boy had done his job). In front of neighbours and family members, Ler put up a shocked expression, repeatedly telling his wife to not sleep while calling her name. Leong's brother told Ler that the ambulance was arriving and told the family to get some towels to stop the bleeding. They thought she had been stabbed on her chest and neck only; it was only after they cut Leong's clothes away and discovered a stab wound on her back. While the family were busy attending to Leong, the 15-year-old murderer fled to a bus stop, where he hired a taxi and rode it to the beach, and disposed the murder weapon into the sea, as what Ler instructed him to prior to murdering Leong.

An ambulance arrived and brought Leong to Tan Tock Seng Hospital. A few hours later, on the midnight of 15 May 2001, 30-year-old Annie Leong Wai Mun died from her injuries. An autopsy had certified that Leong had died from "acute haemorrhage due to stab wounds of heart and lung". The neck and chest wounds were measured 6 cm and 15 cm long respectively.

== Anthony Ler's arrest ==
Ler at his wife's funeral

The police investigations, led by ASP Richard Lim Beng Gee, were conducted as soon as they took the case. The police scoured the crime scene and found only one clue; a torn front page of a newspaper, which the 15-year-old used to wrap up the knife. During their interrogation of Ler, he was uncooperative, hostile and aggressive, denying any involvement in the murder of his wife, much to the police's surprise and suspicion, as normally when one's spouse was killed, the other should have been cooperative and ensure the killer be brought to justice. This led the police to determine Ler as a prime suspect.

Ler put on a charade in front of the mourning family members and friends at his wife's funeral, pretending to be sorrowful and teary about the death of his wife. Ler once told reporters that he himself was a bad husband, confessing that he was being unfaithful and debt-ridden; he even described himself as a "devil" while calling his wife an "angel".

After his police interview, Ler agreed to allow police to search his flat and there, police found out that one of the newspapers in Ler's home had its front page torn out. When asked about this, Ler lied that he did not know where the missing torn page was. The police collected additional evidence from Ler's home for investigation purposes. On 18 May 2001, four days after Annie Leong's murder, the police officers also brought in two of Ler's known acquaintances for questioning. One of them was Gavin Ng and the other was the 15-year-old himself. Earlier on, the 15-year-old teenager had told Gavin that he had killed Annie Leong, much to the shock and anger of Gavin, who also informed the other boys about the murder.

The police were amazed to find the boy soon confessed to the killing out of guilt, and that he did it under the orders of Ler. This ultimately led to the arrest of Ler, who was charged with abetment of murder, which was also a hanging offence like murder under the law of Singapore and thus warranted a mandatory death sentence at that time.

The 15-year-old youth, who appeared as a lanky and bespectacled teenager, was also placed under arrest and charged with murder. His unknown identity was withheld from the media since he was aged below 16 years old and thus could not be named. Additionally, one published photograph of the boy, which captured his face, was also edited to cover his face to prevent his identity being exposed to the public. When they received the news of their son's arrest and involvement in the crime, the 15-year-old boy's parents expressed their shock, claiming they knew their son was innately a good and caring boy, which made them not able to understand why he would do something so violent.

== Sentencing and execution ==
=== The prosecution's case ===
Ler leaving the High Court in November 2001

On 19 November 2001, both Anthony Ler and the 15-year-old boy stood trial together in the High Court of Singapore for the murder of Annie Leong. The case was heard before Judicial Commissioner Tay Yong Kwang of the High Court. The prosecution consisted of Deputy Public Prosecutors (DPPs) Low Cheong Yeow and Edwin San Ong Kyar, while for the two defendants, Anthony Ler was represented by veteran lawyer Subhas Anandan and his assistant Anand Nalachandran, while the youth was represented by lawyers Edwin Seah Li Ming and Peter Ong Lip Cheng. Additionally, to protect his identity due to his age, the teenager was renamed "Z" in the court documents and the media.

As for Ler, despite facing the gallows, he kept wearing a strange smile on his face throughout the court proceedings and in the media. Subhas, in his memoir The Best I Could, he stated that in fact, he was not keen to take the case in the first place, as he had followed the news about the developments of the case and knew Ler would be found guilty eventually. But when Ler's mother and sister came to him and wanted him to defend Ler, he could not bring himself to reject it and thus accepted the case after seeing Ler's mother's tears and her desperation to help her son. He expressed that he, like members of the public, wondered about the smile which Anthony Ler made, speculating that it could be a sneer or security blanket.

The prosecution's case against Anthony Ler was largely based on the statements and hand-written confession made by Z. They called witnesses including Gavin Ng, Seah Tze Howe, Kong Ka Cheong, Vickneswaran Krishnan and the other teenagers present when Ler met up with the five boys. All the boys and girls verified that Anthony Ler frequently brought up the subject of wanting his wife dead. Additionally, the ex-lovers of Ler - Belinda Ho and Marilyn Tan - also took the stand, telling the court that Ler had told them on some occasions that he thirsted for the death of his wife.

The prosecution also obtained evidence from Ler's computer, where police found and recovered the deleted emails which Ler used to communicate with Z after the death of Annie Leong, for which the conversation was about the payment to be made after the deed; this, together with the matching of the torn front page to Ler's newspaper, had clearly made inference to Ler's guilt of the crime, as what Z claimed in his statements.

Among the contents of the deleted emails recovered from Ler's computer, one incriminating statement read:

Payment might have to wait.

Once again, in his memoir, Subhas wrote that when he met Ler in the prison where he was remanded and showed him the retrieved files of his computer (detailing his conversation with the boy about his wife's murder), Ler's signature smile faded; that was the only time, from Subhas's words, he saw Ler's smile disappearing. Subhas speculated that Ler might have realized that he would not get away with it after seeing the recovered contents of his emails.

=== Anthony Ler's defence ===
In his defense on 26 November 2001, Ler stated that he was innocent, and that he did not mastermind the murder of his wife or tell Z to kill his wife. He stated all those talks of wanting his wife dead, were all a "joke" and a bluff. When he was asked why he did not bring a pen beforehand, Ler claimed that he had no habit to bring a pen (though he was being told that he could have borrowed the pen from the nearest coffee shop, which is just a 10-minute walk away from the playground). When asked why he stayed behind with his daughter instead of accompanying his wife up the 4th floor, Ler said that he just wanted to spend more time with his daughter, whom he loved very much. He showed no remorse throughout the trial for his heinous crime and only smiled.

=== Z's defence ===
Z took the stand after Anthony Ler on 28 November 2001 to put up his defence. On the stand, he said essentially the same thing as what he told the police. He also stated that he was forced and manipulated by Anthony Ler to do the killing, for which he claimed that his actions as a result of the manipulation did not amount to the crime of murder, but of culpable homicide not amounting to murder.

When it was Ler's lawyer Subhas Anandan's turn to cross-examine Z, he strongly pointed out why did Z not tell the police in his first statement that he was forced to kill Annie Leong by Ler, furthermore, why did Z not tell Ler in the first place that he did not want to do it if he himself did not want to, like Gavin did. The youth replied that he did not know what to do and was confused when he was asked by Anthony Ler to murder Leong. The lawyer went on to put it to Z that he was lying about Anthony Ler instigating him to commit the murder, calling him "no angel" and "a monster" well-deserving of a long stay behind bars. He even sought to paint the teenager as a cold hearted murderer who was vicious enough to implicate an innocent person (Ler) in the murder, much to Z's adamant denials on the stand. When asked if he was hurt that Ler compared him to Gavin as inferior in terms of maturity and guts (which Ler did in their meetings) and wanted Ler to look up to him, Z concede that he did, and agreed that he would do anything to prove people wrong but he said he would not do so by murdering Ler's wife.

=== Verdict ===
Ler after he was sentenced to death

At the end of the trial on 5 December 2001, nearly seven months after the death of Annie Leong, and after receiving the closing submissions from the prosecution and defence the day before, JC Tay Yong Kwang delivered his judgement.

After summarising the case, the judge rejected Anthony Ler's claims of innocence, and determined that he solicited the murder based on the review of evidence in court. He stated that what Ler did was not a joke but "a serious death match on the chess board of reality where the young men were to be his pawns and he as 'king' would direct the demise of his 'queen'.", and that he was not playing a game of bluff when broaching about the matter of wanting his wife dead, especially from his attempts on Gavin, Tze Howe and Z to get them involved. JC Tay also concluded that Ler had every motive to kill his wife from what the prosecution presented, as he stood to gain from his wife's death by becoming the sole surviving parent of their daughter and the sole surviving joint owner of the flat. He additionally stated that while Ler may have loved his daughter, that love was clearly "eclipsed by his financial and matrimonial problems" from his actions of abetting the murder of Leong. Therefore, JC Tay found Ler's reactions to be "nothing more than rehearsed acts performed by an accomplished actor".

As for 15-year-old Z, JC Tay believed that he was not a cold blooded killer. He described the boy in his own words:

I see no mean miniature monster in Z. I detect no vengeful or vicious spirit in this 15 year old boy before me. I see instead a morose and mortified teenager who is still trying to come to terms with the cataclysmic events of the last seven months. He is not capable of concocting such an elaborate and consistent yarn. He does not have the presence of mind nor the mental agility to utilize and corrupt information to his own advantage or to the detriment of others.

The judge accepted that Z was telling the truth about his experiences with Ler, as well as the testimonies of Z's friends (in particular, Tze Howe and Gavin), finding them truthful witnesses. He said that the boy would not have been able to describe his ordeal so clearly had it not been the truth. He said that the only fault of Z was that he was naive and simple-minded, saying that he was being made use of by Ler, an adult who was "experienced in the ways of the world", an adult who tempted Z with the offer of easy money, dreams of glamour and sex, and an ornamental sword that he craved and even led the boy psychologically and persistently down the path of his self destruction. And in the end, Ler gave the boy an ultimatum: "kill or be killed". In his words once again, Z appears to be "a rather simple-minded and mild-mannered boy ensnared haplessly way out of season in adult intrigue and machinations". Nearing the end of his 57-page-long written verdict, JC Tay summarised the case in six words:

"Murder Anthony wrote, murder Z wrought."

As such, Anthony Ler was found guilty and convicted of soliciting and abetting the murder of his wife and condemned to death. Z was convicted of murder, but was instead sentenced to be detained indefinitely during the President's Pleasure since he was too young to be executed.

Z's lawyer Edwin Seah said to reporters that Z wanted to continue studying for his GCE N-levels examinations, which he was supposed to take that same year he killed Annie Leong. And, despite him acting as the lawyer of Anthony Ler and being merciless towards the boy during his cross-examination of Z, Subhas Anandan wished the boy well nonetheless, stating that Z, after all, was just a 15-year-old boy and still deserved a second chance.

=== Appeal and execution ===
After the original trial, Subhas appealed the verdict on behalf of his client Anthony Ler, and it was heard before three judges - Chief Justice Yong Pung How, Judge of Appeal Chao Hick Tin and High Court judge Tan Lee Meng - in the Court of Appeal of Singapore. However, the appeal was rejected on 4 March 2002; the three judges agreed with the High Court's decision and reject Anthony Ler's claims of innocence based on the evidence they reviewed. Initially, Z also appealed against his conviction but later withdrew his appeal. The clemency plea to President S. R. Nathan, which Ler submitted in hope of having his death sentence commuted to life imprisonment was also dismissed. Eventually, on 13 December 2002, for abetting the murder of his wife, 35-year-old Anthony Ler Wee Teang was hanged in Changi Prison at dawn.

Before his client was hanged, Subhas wrote in his memoir that when he came to see Anthony Ler one last time, Ler thanked him for his efforts in defending him, and having known that Subhas lost a kidney to cancer, Ler offered to donate his kidneys to him as a sign of gratitude. Despite his gratitude and appreciation of Ler's offer, Subhas politely turned down Ler's sincere offer, he felt that he should not accept it by ethical means because it would make everyone misinterpret that he defended Ler just for his kidneys. He speculated that Ler's wishes to donate his organs could have possibly been atonement for his crime. He added that Ler initially did not want to sign the clemency petition, but he did it for the sake of his mother. In his memoir he wrote, only one of Ler's two brothers was present at the funeral but no one else (possibly due to the murderer's notoriety) and before his execution, Anthony Ler said that he could not stop thinking about his daughter.

The lawyer added that when he visited Changi Prison shortly after Anthony Ler's death, before meeting up with another client who was on death row, he asked a prison officer if Ler was smiling while walking to the gallows, to which the prison officer said nothing but only smiled at Subhas.

== Aftermath ==
=== Z's imprisonment and pardon ===
"Z" (pseudonym)
- Born: Between 25 and 31 December 1985; Singapore
- Status: Released since 2 November 2018
- Conviction: Murder (1 count)
- Penalty: Indefinite detention at the President's Pleasure (5 December 2001)
- Accomplice: Anthony Ler Wee Teang (executed for abetment of murder)

Details
- Victims: 1
- Date: 1 May 2001–14 May 2001
- Country: Singapore
- Date apprehended: 18 May 2001

Z remained in prison for the next 17 years. After passing his GCE N-levels, Z studied for both his GCE O-levels and A-levels, and he topped both exams in the prison school. He also enrolled in a university, majoring in English and business studies, for which he earned a degree. He was said to have model behaviour during his period of incarceration and had inspired other inmates to do so. Z also reportedly learnt how to play a guitar and harmonica in prison.

Z was said to be deeply regretful for having committed the murder. He has expressed in his hand-written confession that how much he wished he had never met Ler, and how he had let his parents and other people he knew around him down. According to Z's mother, she said her son had once told her in a prison visit that he dreamed of the late victim Annie Leong, who asked him why did he kill her. Z was said to have broke down after telling his mother that Leong forgiven him for his act after he told Leong that her husband (Anthony Ler) manipulated him to kill her. In addition, consultant psychiatrist Lim Yun Chin, who counselled Z after his crime, also stated that Z was remorseful for what he had done, and the boy acknowledged that this would be something he will have to struggle with for the rest of his life. Lim had earlier appeared at the original trial to testify on behalf of Z, that the boy's IQ of 93 made him prone to adult manipulation and confirming to the court that Z did not have any abnormality of mind.

In 2013, Z filed for clemency, but was turned down by President Tony Tan. Four years later, in November 2017, through his original lawyer Peter Ong Lip Cheng, Z once again appealed for clemency, this time to President Halimah Yacob, garnering widespread media coverage and public attention in Singapore. Ong also spoke to reporters on 6 January 2018 about his client, who celebrated his 32nd birthday the week before (possibly 31 December), stating that there were testimonials backing his model behaviour and maturity in prison, and that Z was hopeful to be given a chance to return to society and reunite with his parents.

In April 2018, Z's mother (Note: The newspaper article reported her name as Mrs Docras Lee, which could be a pseudonym to protect her identity.) spoke publicly, expressing her hope for a positive outcome from the clemency petition. Two of Z's former fellow detainees, 42 year-old Allan Ong and 42 year-old Kyaneth Soo, also spoke publicly in newspapers, citing examples of their current stable and clean lives and jobs in support of Z to allow him be given a second chance to reintegrate into society. Both Ong and Soo were detained for 13 years and six months under the President's Pleasure after their conviction in 1999 for a 1994 gang-related murder, and were released in 2012. They were both neighbours with Z in the prison where they were detained at.

On 2 November 2018, President Halimah Yacob decided to, on the advice of the Cabinet, grant Z clemency and remitted the remaining part of his sentence. Z was released on the same day he received clemency from the President, more than 17 years after he killed Annie Leong, but his release was only reported in newspapers a month later. Z was also told to adhere to special conditions such as curfew hours and electronic monitoring, and he would continue to receive rehabilitative support to ensure his reintegration into society. In addition, a gag order remains to protect his identity due to his age at the time of the murder. Z's lawyer Peter Ong told newspapers that he was grateful that the President pardoned Z and gave him a second chance in life, and told reporters that when he finally came home 17 years since his arrest, Z was celebrating his birthday together with his family in the same month when newspapers reported his release.

After Z was released, Muhammad Nasir bin Abdul Aziz was the only prisoner left detained at the President's Pleasure, which was abolished after a review of the Criminal Procedure Code of Singapore in 2010.

=== The fates of Annie Leong's family and Z's friends ===
An article from The Straits Times on 16 December 2018, 3 days after Z's release, reported that Annie Leong's family still reside in the Hougang flat where Leong was murdered. Chin Chooi Ling, Leong's mother (who was in her seventies), no longer felt bitter about the case and moved on, and a family friend stated that Chin committed herself to her Christian faith and found closure. Ever since the death of Leong, Chin raised her granddaughter, who was a university undergraduate at this point in time.

Seah Tze Howe, one of Z's friends, said that he moved on with his life but could not cope with the case's impact on him (which lasted for five to six years), especially when he was recognised by members of the public as a result of his photos being published online and on newspapers covering the case. It was reported that Tze Howe, then 39 years old, was married and was a restaurant owner at that point of time when Z was released.

== In popular media ==
=== Re-enactments ===
The case of Anthony Ler was re-enacted in Crimewatch in 2002. Similarly, Ler's case and trial was re-enacted in the second season of True Files, a Singapore crime show; which was aired as the season's first episode on 26 August 2003. In the episode, Z was renamed as "Steven" by the producers of the show to protect the boy's identity. Z's friends were also featured in the show with their true identities changed and both Ler's lawyer Subhas Anandan and Z's psychiatrist Lim Yun Chin appeared on screen to be interviewed in the episode.

The incident of Annie Leong's murder was also recorded in Subhas Anandan's memoir The Best I Could, which features the lawyer's early life, career and his notable cases. The memoir was adapted into a TV show of the same name, which runs for two seasons. The case was re-enacted and aired as the first episode of the show's first season. In the re-enactment episode, Z was renamed as Daniel.

=== Publication ===
Subhas Anandan, the former lawyer of Anthony Ler, published his first memoir The Best I Could. He wrote Anthony Ler's case as one of the cases he was well known for. The book was first published in 2009.

In July 2015, Singapore's national daily newspaper The Straits Times (ST) published an e-book titled Guilty As Charged: 25 Crimes That Have Shaken Singapore Since 1965, which included the criminal case of Anthony Ler as one of the top 25 crimes that shocked the nation since its independence in 1965. The book was borne out of collaboration between the Singapore Police Force and ST, with editing done by a ST news associate editor, Abdul Hafiz bin Abdul Samad. The paperback edition of the book was published and first hit the bookshelves in end-June 2017. The paperback edition first entered the ST bestseller list on 8 August 2017. Some edited excerpts of the hand-written confession which Z submitted to the police and court were reproduced in the book's chapter of the Anthony Ler incident. The original version of Z's hand-written confession was available in the High Court's judgement of Anthony Ler's murder trial.

A 2021 article from The Smart Local named the case of Annie Leong's murder as one of the 9 most terrible crimes that brought shock to Singapore in the 2000s.

== See also ==
- Capital punishment in Singapore
- The President's Pleasure
- List of major crimes in Singapore
