= The President's Pleasure (Singapore) =

Legal punishment in Singapore

The President's Pleasure (TPP) in Singapore was a practice of indefinite imprisonment formerly applied to offenders who were convicted of capital offences (most notably murder and drug trafficking) but were below the age of 18 at the time of their crimes. Such offenders were not sentenced to death in accordance with the death penalty laws in Singapore; they were instead indefinitely detained by order of the President of Singapore. This is similarly practised contemporarily for offenders who were of unsound mind when they committed their crimes, who are thus indefinitely detained at prisons or medical facilities (notably the Institute of Mental Health) in Singapore.

== Procedure ==
=== Underaged offenders ===
The practice of The President's Pleasure was inherited from the British colonial rule of Singapore. Similar to the TPP in Singapore, Britain decreed that youths who commit capital crimes when aged below 18 would not be subject to capital punishment, but to indefinite detention at His Majesty's Pleasure. This practice in Britain for capital offences continued until Britain abolished the death penalty.

Under Section 213 of the Criminal Procedure Code (Cap. 68, 1985 Ed.), it was ruled that people found guilty of a capital offence committed while under 18 years of age are spared the death penalty and detained indefinitely at the President's Pleasure. The section was repealed in 2010 following the revision of the Criminal Procedure Code of Singapore.

Extracted from a judgement titled Public Prosecutor v Anthony Ler Wee Teang and Another [2001] SGHC 361 (the original text of Section 213 of the CPC; repealed in 2010):

213. Sentence of death shall not be pronounced on or recorded against a person convicted of an offence if it appears to the court that at the time when the offence was committed he was under the age of 18 years but instead of that the court shall sentence him to be detained during the President's pleasure, and, if so sentenced, he shall be liable to be detained in such place and under such conditions as the President directs, and while so detained shall be deemed to be in legal custody.

Under this TPP measure, the normal length of detention would be between 10 and 20 years. The detainees under this measure will be periodically reviewed by the President's Pleasure Board (appointed by the Minister for Home Affairs) every four years up to the tenth year, when they are annually reviewed and would be considered for release after serving at least 13 years. The President can direct their release, based on a recommendation, if they are found suitable for release. This is done so by granting the detainee clemency, as notably proven by the clemency appeal process by the underaged hired killer in the Anthony Ler case, who was detained under the TPP for killing Ler's wife under Ler's orders and manipulation.

During the period of their incarceration, the detainees would be in workshops within the institution or undergo vocational and educational programmes, which was determinant of their conduct and behaviour in prison. Such inmates would also be allowed access to family contact through regular visits.

=== Offenders of unsound mind ===
Under this measure, which was carried out by the Singapore Prison Service, it was ruled that any offender, regardless of their age at the time of the commission of the offence, are to be acquitted of any crimes if they were certified to be of unsound mind at the time of the offences. In such cases, the Minister for Law is notified and may issue an order for their detention under the TPP. Such offenders will be placed in confinement at the Institute of Mental Health or at prisons. Unlike the practice for underaged offenders, this form of TPP did not have a minimum period of detention.

Every six months, the criminals detained under this provision will have their mental conditions reviewed by psychiatrists. If the psychiatric review finds that a detainee may be discharged without danger of injuring himself/herself or others, the Minister for Law may order his/her release. During their detention, the detainees may be released into the custody of a friend or relative who provides security and promises to care for them properly and prevent them from injuring themselves or others.

Extracted from a judgement titled Public Prosecutor v Tan Kok Meng [2020] SGHC 225 (the original text of Section 251 of the CPC):

Acquittal on ground of unsound mind 251. If an accused is acquitted on the ground that at the time at which he is alleged to have committed an offence he was by reason of unsoundness of mind incapable of knowing the nature of the act as constituting the offence or that it was wrong or contrary to law, the finding must state specifically whether he committed the act or not.

Original text of Section 252 of the CPC:

Safe custody of person acquitted 252 (1) Whenever the finding states that the accused committed the act alleged, the court before which the trial has been held shall, if that act would but for the incapacity found have constituted an offence, order that person to be kept in safe custody in such place and manner as the court thinks fit and shall report the case for the orders of the Minister. (2) The Minister may order that person to be confined in a psychiatric institution, prison or other suitable place of safe custody during the President’s pleasure.

== Statistics ==
=== Underaged offenders ===
Reportedly, for the form of TPP addressing the underaged, from 1969 to 2001, the shortest time spent under TPP was seven years and the longest was 26 years, and ten of the detainees were granted clemency. It was further revealed in a December 2001 report, that there were 14 people serving detention under the TPP. In May 2008, a month after the latest conviction of an underaged offender, Muhammad Nasir Abdul Aziz, for murder, there were seven underaged offenders (including Nasir himself) serving time under the TPP. In January 2018, there were two inmates of the TPP remaining in prison. These inmates—Muhammad Nasir Abdul Aziz and the unnamed contract killer of Annie Leong—were the last two people serving time under the TPP since its abolition in 2010. At the same time, since 2012 until January 2018, there are three other inmates—consisting of Allan Ong and Kyaneth Soo and another unnamed detainee—who were released after serving between 13 and 19 years in jail and receiving clemency from the President of Singapore. There were no specific data regarding the number of inmates detained annually or their release dates (for most of the inmates).

From 1965 until 2008, there were reports of underaged offenders who were found guilty of murder and drug trafficking but given an indefinite detention period under the TPP due to them not reaching the age of 18, though two of these people—Mohammed Salleh Daim from 1965 and Sa'at Ismail from 1976—managed to escape the TPP detention due to successful appeals against their convictions. Most of the cases were murder cases. Most of the offenders were male, and most of these inmates were local. Racially, most of the offenders were Chinese, while among the rest, there were a handful of Malays and only one was of Indian descent.

=== Offenders of unsound mind ===
As of 14 December 2017, there were three offenders being detained under this practice due to them being of unsound mind at the time of their offences. Two of them had committed murder while the third had committed the crime of voluntarily causing grievous hurt with a dangerous weapon.

== 1960s ==
=== P. Nadarajan (1965) ===
On the evening of 4 February 1965, 18-year-old Abdul Ghany Ahmad, who was sweeping the drains in Dorset Road, witnessed a known acquaintance—30-year-old P. Nadarajan—walking towards his two younger brothers—Abdul Wahid Ahmad, aged four, and Abdul Jamal Ahmad, aged four—who were playing on a concrete bridge nearby. The next moment, Ghany saw Nadarajan pick up a wooden pole and use it to hit Wahid on the head thrice, much to his horror and anger. Ghany rushed to his brother's aid and hit Nadarajan (who threw the pole into the drain) on the back with his broom, confronting the man and asking him why he attacked his brother. Nadarajan, however, did not give an answer and walked away nonchalantly. Three-year-old Wahid, who suffered a fractured skull, was subsequently rushed to Outram Hospital, where he died on the night itself.

Nadarajan was arrested a few days later, and on 22 February 1965, he was charged with murder. He was said to have provided the deceased boy and his brothers and sisters with sweets and had slept under the staircase at the front of Wahid's house. However, a psychiatrist found that Nadarajan was a psychopath and was thus of unsound mind when he killed Wahid. It was also found that for this illness, Nadarajan had been once hospitalised in a mental hospital on 23 October 1962, till his release on an unspecified date prior to the murder of Wahid.

On 28 February 1973, more than eight years after he murdered Wahid, 38-year-old Nadarajan pleaded guilty to a reduced charge of voluntarily causing grievous hurt. He was ordered to be taken to Woodbridge Hospital, where he was detained indefinitely under TPP until he was fit for release.

=== Mohammed Salleh Daim (1965) ===
At a pasar malam in Trevose Crescent on 17 August 1965, 35-year-old Rafie Osman was found dead with a knife embedded in his chest. There was also another serious stab wound on his waist. It was said that the victim and his two companions had been attacked by a group of men armed with knives before he was found dead.

Seven men were arrested in suspicion of committing the murder, though it would ultimately be four of them charged with murder. The four men were: Ramlan Manijan, 19; Mohamed Adat, 29; Hisom Mahidi, 25; and Mohammed Salleh Daim, 17. In their trial a year later, both Mohamed and Hisom denied the murder charge while putting up their defence while the other two remained silent. At the end of the trial on 28 July 1966, a seven-men jury unanimously found three men (Mohamed, Salleh and Ramlan) guilty of murder while they found Hisom, by a 6–1 decision, guilty of murder. Salleh, who was aged below 18 at the time of the crime, was ordered to be detained indefinitely under TPP, while the other three were sentenced to death.

All four men appealed against their convictions. On 10 March 1967, the Court of Appeal overturned the convictions of all the four accused persons, and set them free due to the evidence being tainted and the jury not properly directed by the trial judge on some reasons.

=== Lim Yau Hung (1966) ===
On 11 October 1966, a 15-year-old student named Lim Yau Hung, nicknamed "Barber's Son", was accused of murdering a construction worker named Loo Tuck Fai on 26 June 1966 in Jalan Bukit Ho Swee. A member of "Gi Hup 24" gang, 18-year-old Loo was said to have been chased by a group led by Lim, who then attacked Loo and inflicted a total of 52 stab wounds on him. Loo died in hospital two hours after the attack. Lim, in his trial, denied that he took part in the killing even though he admitted that he was at the scene. He claimed that he followed suit with two other unnamed boys to give chase when they saw Loo but he stopped and remained at where he was while the others continued to chase Loo. Lim's accomplices, who were three or four boys, were never found despite the police's efforts to trace their identities or whereabouts, and the prosecution argued that Lim's actions were made in furtherance of the group's common intention to commit the crime.

On 23 June 1967, Lim Yau Hung, who was then aged 16 years and two months, was found guilty of murder. The seven-member jury found Lim guilty by a 5–2 decision, and High Court judge Murray Buttrose, in accordance to the jury's verdict, decided to sentence Lim to serve an indeterminate jail sentence under TPP since he was underaged at the time of the crime and thus cannot be sentenced to death. The Federal Court rejected Lim's appeal five months later on 2 December, with Singapore's then Chief Justice Wee Chong Jin citing that the jury's verdict did not make a miscarriage of justice from the judge's direction of the jury regarding the law's definition of common intention in the crime.

=== Lee Boo Tiong (1969) ===
On 20 November 1969, 16-year-old Lee Boo Tiong, a construction labourer, stabbed and murdered Ong Ah Her, a wooden manufacturer in his factory after he tried to extort $10 from Ong's brother. Lee was found guilty of murder in September 1970, but since his actual age was 16 years and 10 months and he was not 18 years old and above at the time of the crime, he was imprisoned under TPP. Lee filed an appeal against his conviction, but it was dismissed on 15 August 1972.

== 1970s ==
=== Stephen Lee Hock Khoon and Ringo Lee Chiew Chwee (1971) ===
On 29 December 1971, ten people aged between 16 and 34 were involved in the triple killings of a businessman cum gold bar smuggler and his two assistants after robbing them of 120 gold bars worth $500,000. The businessman, 55-year-old Ngo Cheng Poh, along with his assistants—57-year-old Ang Boon Chai and 51-year-old Leong Chin Woo—were found dead in a jungle by conscript soldiers training near the area. The police investigations conducted after the discovery of the bodies led to the arrests of the 10 men. The 10 men were: Andrew Chou Hock Guan, 25; David Chou Hock Heng, 34; Peter Lim Swee Guan, 24; Augustine Ang Cheng Siong, 25; Alex Yau Hean Thye, 19; Stephen Francis, 20; Richard James, 18; Konesekaram Nagalingam, 18; Stephen Lee Hock Khoon, 16; and Ringo Lee Chiew Chwee, 16. The 120 stolen gold bars were also recovered. The case was known as the "Gold Bars Triple Murders".

In October 1972, the murder trial began, with nine of the ten men standing trial. The tenth man, Ang, was granted a discharge not amounting to an acquittal as he had confessed to the police upon his arrest and had cooperated with the police during their investigations. Consequently, for his participation in the murder, Ang was detained indefinitely without trial; he spent around 16 years in prison before his release in the 1980s. During the 40-day trial, Ang became the chief prosecution witness against all the nine men, who pleaded not guilty to murder. The nine men were subsequently found guilty of murder in December 1972; however, seven of them were sentenced to death while the remaining two, Stephen Lee and Ringo Lee, were spared the gallows as they were under the age of 18 at the time of the murders. Both Stephen Lee and Ringo Lee were detained under TPP. Meanwhile, after exhausting all their avenues of appeal, the seven men were eventually hung on 28 February 1975.

After serving 17 years in prison, Ringo Lee, aged 33 or 34 at that point, was released in 1988 or 1989. Stephen Lee was detained for a longer term under TPP before he was released, presumably in the 1990s and before 2002.

=== Lim Heng Chau (1975) ===
On 20 December 1975, 17-year-old Lim Heng Chau was arrested at Woodlands Checkpoint for carrying 499 grams of heroin. Lim pleaded guilty to drug trafficking but since he was below 18 years old at the time of the crime, Lim was ordered to be detained indefinitely under TPP. He was the first convicted drug trafficker to escape the gallows since the introduction of the death penalty for trafficking more than 15 grams of heroin in December 1975, the same month of his arrest for the offence.

=== Sa'at Ismail (1976) ===
On 13 September 1976, 13-year-old Sa'at Ismail approached 68-year-old Letchimi Vilappan near a coffee shop in Serangoon Road, set a newspaper on fire, and threw it at the sleeping woman, causing her to be burned to death. Before the incident, Sa'at was said to have quarrels with the woman and he decided to harm her after the woman gave him a lot of trouble and after his father refused to give him pocket money or speak to him. Sa'at, who was a day short of celebrating his 14th birthday when he killed Letchimi, was arrested and charged with murder.

At the trial, Sa'at claimed that he did not expect that Letchimi would be severely burned to death as he only wanted to burn her legs and frighten her. Nevertheless, the High Court found Sa'at guilty of murder on 27 May 1977. However, due to his age, Sa'at escaped the death penalty and thus he was indefinitely detained under TPP. Sa'at, who began serving his sentence in Changi Prison, was reportedly the 12th person to be held under TPP and it was speculated that he would spend around ten years in prison for Letchimi's murder. Upon appeal, however, Sa'at's murder conviction was reduced to one of voluntarily causing grievous hurt, and thus his sentence was reduced to three years' probation.

In the aftermath of the case, Sa'at grew up and became a male prostitute and transvestite. He ran afoul of the law once again a few times. On 15 December 1984, Sa'at chopped off the genitals of a 47-year-old client and set his blanket on fire. He also committed arson on 15 February 1985 by setting a British man's apartment on fire after spiking the man's drink with sleeping pills. Other than those, Sa'at had also committed theft by stealing the possessions of his clients. Sa'at was sentenced to four years' imprisonment for this string of offences on 8 December 1986. On 12 February 1990, 27-year-old Sa'at robbed a tourist after spiking his drink. A district court convicted Sa'at and sentenced him to five years' corrective training four months later for the robbery.

== 1980s ==
=== Rathakrishnan Ramasamy (1981) ===
On 20 September 1981, after having a heated argument with another man while driving in a lorry, 22-year-old lorry driver Ramu Annadavascan stopped his lorry near East Coast Park and got off together with 45-year-old boilerman, Kalingam Mariappan, with whom Ramu had been arguing with earlier on. The two men were joined by Ramu's 16-year-old friend and news vendor, Rathakrishnan Ramasamy, who was sitting at the back of the lorry. Armed with a gardening rake, Ramu hit Kalingam on the head with the rake once. Rathakrishnan then took the rake from Ramu and hit Kalingam on the head; this time, the second blow from Rathakrishnan proved fatal. After Kalingam fell unconscious on the grass, Ramu told Rathakrishnan to bring petrol over.

After pouring petrol on Kalingam's body, whom they presumed dead, Ramu lit a match and set Kalingam on fire, causing Kalingam to suddenly get up and roll in pain just when both men were about to leave. The duo left in Ramu's lorry, leaving behind Kalingam, who was eventually burned to death. Two days later, Kalingam's wife Supalatmi, who was unaware of her husband's death, reported him missing when she had not seen her husband returning home for the last two days. Police investigations soon led to the arrests of both Ramu and Rathakrishnan, who were both last seen with Kalingam having drinks of beer before they left in Ramu's lorry on that day itself. The two men were charged with murder. It was further revealed in the trial of the two men three years later that both Kalingam and Ramu had a bad relationship due to some unsettled conflicts and often argued with each other.

On 3 July 1984, despite their defences of no intent to kill Kalingam, both Ramu and Rathakrishnan were found guilty of murder. Ramu was condemned to death while Rathakrishnan was sentenced to imprisonment under TPP since he was below 18 years old when he committed the crime. Both men lost their appeals against their convictions on 14 January 1985. On 19 September 1986, Ramu was hanged at dawn in Changi Prison. Rathakrishnan spent the next 20 years in prison after his arrest before he was released in September 2001. According to True Files, a Singaporean crime show re-enacting the murder, Rathakrishnan was said to have taken the GCE O-levels examinations and received a certificate, and worked with his relative after his release.

The case of Rathakrishnan and Ramu was recorded in The Best I Could, the memoir of Ramu's former defence lawyer, Subhas Anandan. The memoir was written about Subhas's early life, career and his notable cases.

=== Pariah Sedik (1982) ===
On 25 February 1982, 44-year-old Pariah Sedik pleaded guilty to using a parang to slash her two grandchildren – 2-month-old Mohamed Heymey and 1-year-old Mohamed Rizal – in their Dairy Farm Road home in March 1981. She even ran out of the house and threatened to kill herself before she was captured. A district court sentenced her to serve time under TPP as she was found to be of unsound mind at the time of the offences.

=== Tan Ho Teck (1984) ===
On 18 February 1984, 25-year-old Tan Ho Teck stabbed his brother and sister with a knife and caused grievous injuries. Tan's sister, 23-year-old Tan Lay Tin, was stabbed thrice in the stomach but survived due to an emergency surgery, but Tan's brother, 21-year-old Tan Kah Kuan, was stabbed in the lung and he died. Tan Ho Teck was charged with murder. Before that, Tan had run afoul of the law once in 1978 when he raped a female teenage student. For this crime, he had not been caught until 1980, and had been sentenced to five years' imprisonment for rape. He was released early on grounds of good behaviour prior to murdering his brother.

While Tan was in remand, it was assessed that at the time of the attack, he was suffering from delirium due to acute alcohol intoxication, in addition to depression. His attacks on his siblings were also signs of delirium, according to psychiatrist R. Nagulendran, for which this diagnosis was supported by Chew Seck Kee, a government psychiatrist from Woodbridge Hospital. For the murder charge, Tan was found guilty on 7 March 1987, but was acquitted due to him being of unsound mind when he committed the crime. He was thus confined at a mental hospital under TPP.

== 1990s ==
=== Mohammad Iskandar Mohammad Ali (1991) ===
On 16 March 1991, a 66-year-old woman, Tang Sai Tiong, was robbed and stabbed five times at her flat in Marsiling. When she staggered out, a 10 cm long knife was embedded on her abdomen. Her attacker managed to escape. After she was rushed to hospital, Tang was pronounced dead nine hours later.

The crime remained unsolved for three years. In January 1994, Mohammad Iskandar Mohammad Ali, an 18-year-old teenager, was arrested and found to be responsible for the murder. Iskandar was charged with murder and he admitted to killing Tang during a robbery attempt on 16 March 1991. A year later, on 15 February 1995, Iskandar was found guilty of murder. However, as Iskandar's actual age was 14 years and 11 months at the time he committed the offence, he was not sentenced to death and instead imprisoned under TPP.

=== Lam Hoi-ka (1991) ===
On 16 July 1991, after their arrival at Changi Airport from Bangkok, two Hong Kong women were arrested by the police for carrying a total of more than 6 kg of heroin, which were hidden in the false bottom of their suitcases. The two Hong Kong women, 17-year-old Lam Hoi-ka (林凯嘉) and 18-year-old Poon Yuen-chung (潘婉聪), were charged with drug trafficking.

Two years later, the women's joint trial began. The two women denied any knowledge of the drugs. They claimed that a Chinese couple who travelled with them on their holiday trip in Bangkok gave them the two suitcases. The Chinese couple, who bought these suitcases for the women to replace their old ones, were never found. The two women were found guilty of drug trafficking on 28 September 1993. High Court judge M. P. H. Rubin sentenced Lam to indefinite imprisonment under TPP due to her actual age of 17 years and 6 months at the time of her arrest. As for Poon, since her actual age was 18 years and 10 months when she was arrested, she was sentenced to death.

In the aftermath of the case, after the loss of her appeal, and despite the pleas for clemency, 22-year-old Poon was hanged in Changi Prison on 21 April 1995. On the same day of Poon's execution, there were four other drug traffickers hanged at the same time as her. Two of them—24-year-old Tong Ching-man and her 25-year-old boyfriend Lam Cheuk-wang—were also Hong Kong citizens, while one was 34-year-old Singaporean Yeo Hee Seng and the fifth was 32-year-old Nigerian Chris Chinenye Ubaka. Poon, Lam and Tong were reportedly the last three people from Hong Kong to be hanged in Singapore.

Lam was probably the first and only foreigner who was detained indefinitely under TPP in Singapore because of her age.

=== Wong Kwok Wah (1991) ===
At the end of his murder trial in April 1991, 37-year-old Wong Kwok Wah, who murdered his 62-year-old neighbour more than three years ago, was acquitted of murder and detained under TPP because the High Court found that he suffered from both schizophrenia and antisocial personality disorder, which affected his mental capacity and thus amounted to unsoundness of the mind. After his conviction, Wong was sent to the Institute of Mental Health (IMH), where he was detained for 10 years until 2001, when he was transferred to Changi Prison Hospital to continue his detention. Four years later, in 2005, when the prison hospital closed, Wong was transferred to Complex Medical Centre (CMC), where he had been serving his sentence since.

On 3 July 2015, 24 years after his sentencing, Wong filed an appeal against his sentence. The appeal was heard for two days on 19 January 2016 and 25 February 2016, with Wong arguing it on his own without a lawyer representing him. Wong argued that he had been locked up behind bars for 28 years (including the time he spent awaiting trial), which was inhumane. He also clarified he wanted to be sent back to the IMH. However, the Court of Appeal dismissed the appeal on the second day of the hearing, as they found Wong was psychiatrically still a danger to society and was unsuitable for release or to return to the IMH, citing a psychiatrist's opinion that Wong would be highly prone to violence and non-compliance to medication if he was left unsupervised.

On 13 January 2023, Wong and three other criminals detained under the TPP were ordered to be confined further under this detention scheme, on the grounds that Wong and the others still posed a great risk to society if ever released, and in Wong's case, he had violated the detention rules for 34 times, including fights with other prisoners and self-harming, and his lack of ability to integrate with other people.

=== Allan Ong Chee Hoe, Kyaneth Soo Kian Fong and Ng Beng Kiat (1994) ===
In January 1994, three 18-year-old teenagers armed with wooden sticks fatally assaulted and killed a rival gang member, 15-year-old Chia Lap Lai. Chia was initially a part of the gang who attacked him before he left and joined another gang. The attack was due to a territorial dispute between Chia's former gang and Chia's current gang, and was motivated by revenge against Chia changing sides. Soon, one of the three attackers—18-year-old Ng Beng Kiat—was caught, and was charged with murder. A year later, in March 1995, Ng was found guilty of murder; however, as he was not fully 18 years old at the time of the attack, Ng was spared the death penalty and was instead ordered to be detained under TPP. Ng's two other accomplices, Allan Ong Chee Hoe and Kyaneth Soo Kian Fong, were not arrested as they escaped to Malaysia. In November 1998, Ong was finally caught after four years on the run and extradited back to Singapore for trial, while Soo surrendered himself to the police two months later.

In April 1999, five years and three months after Chia's murder, High Court judge M. P. H. Rubin found both Ong and Soo guilty of murder. While delivering his judgement, the judge stated that the attack on Chia was premeditated and the duo, together with Ng (who had been sentenced four years earlier), had carried it out with ill-feeling and vindictiveness, citing the viciousness of the crime. However, both Ong and Soo were not sentenced to death, as they were both aged below 18 when they killed Chia. As such, judge Rubin ordered both Ong and Soo to be detained under TPP.

After their conviction by the High Court in 1999, both Ong and Soo spent the next 13 years and 6 months of their lives in prison. It was in 2012, when both Ong and Soo appealed to President Tony Tan for clemency. The President, acting on the advice of the Cabinet, approved their appeals on account of their good behaviour in prison and allowed the two of them to regain their freedom and rejoin society.

As of 2018, it was reported that Ong and Soo, both 42 years old, were leading reformed and stable lives. Soo was reportedly married with children and self-employed in a restaurant while Ong had been married since 2016 and was working as a technician.

In a Chinese-language article, Soo stated that during the first few years in prison, he repeatedly broke the rules and caused trouble. It was during his fourth year in prison when he started repenting and taking steps to improve himself. He sat for exams and took up jobs in the prison, earning him a better impression in the eyes of the prison officers. While speaking about his past, he hoped that society would be more tolerating of ex-offenders, citing that even though some may be recalcitrant and persisting on their criminal ways, there are others who genuinely want to reform and become better persons. It was revealed that Soo came from a broken family, and his father had severed ties with him at age 15 due to Soo becoming a delinquent—a result of him and his brother being neglected and his mother abandoning him after enduring extreme abuse from Soo's father. Soo stated that while in prison, he tried to reconcile with his father and wrote letters with him, and eventually, his father and he mended their relationship.

=== Lim Peng Ann and his 14-year-old girlfriend (1995) ===
In December 1995, a teenage couple stood trial in the High Court for illegally trafficking 19.7 grams of opium in July 1995, and it was decreed under the law that the death penalty will be warranted if more than 12 grams of opium were trafficked. Lim Peng Ann and his girlfriend were reportedly the youngest people to face the capital charge of drug trafficking, because Lim and the girl were aged 18 and 14 respectively when they committed the offence. Lim's girlfriend was not named in the media since she was below 16 years old when she committed the offence. (Note: However, court documents and a law journal recorded her name as Gwee Siew Kuan.) It was revealed in the court that both Lim and his girlfriend first met each other when the girl was 12, and the girl became pregnant with Lim's child a year later.

In January 1996, Judicial Commissioner Amarjeet Singh of the High Court found the couple guilty of drug trafficking and sentenced them to be detained indefinitely under TPP. During sentencing, the judge told Lim that he was "extremely fortunate" to escape the gallows because when he was arrested for the crime, he was nine days short of celebrating his 18th birthday. The couple's child was entrusted to the care of the girl's mother.

Four months later, in May 1996, Lim's appeal against his conviction was dismissed by the Court of Appeal.

=== Yaacob Mohamed Yatim (1999) ===
In October 1999, 40-year-old Yaacob Mohamed Yatim was involved in a fight with his 46-year-old brother-in-law Abdul Khalim Ahmad, and during the fight, Yaacob stabbed Khalim to death. Yaacob was arrested and charged with murder, which meant he could face the gallows. However, he was found to be suffering from epilepsy, which made him of unsound mind when he killed his brother-in-law. Hence, in March 2000, Yaacob was acquitted of murder and detained under TPP. Yaacob spent seven years in the Institute of Mental Health (IMH) before he was released in 2007. Yaacob was originally married with a daughter named Zulikah, but the little girl died from leukaemia at age seven and his wife, who took away all his money and property and left him, also died in 2008 before the completion of divorce proceedings. After his release, Yaacob went to live with his elderly, widowed mother (aged 86 in 2018) and he continued his treatment until 2011.

In May 2015, Yaacob committed murder again by killing his acquaintance, Abdul Rashid Mohd Nenggal, during a fight, and thus faced the death penalty again. This time, he was found to be fit to plead and stand trial unlike the first time in 1999. Three years later, on 19 April 2018, despite being convicted of murder, Yaacob escaped the gallows once again like he did in 1999 as he was sentenced to life imprisonment by the High Court, after the prosecution decided to not seek the death sentence on account of Yaacob's plea of guilt and Yaacob's lawyer Anand Nalachandran's account of the tragic life his client had gone through and suffered while seeking a life sentence for his client. No caning is imposed because Yaacob was 58 years old when he was sentenced for the murder of Abdul Rashid, and thus he cannot be caned.

During sentencing, High Court judge Chan Seng Onn stated the case as "another unfortunate case" with Abdul Rashid being the one provoking Yaacob and starting the fight, though he made note that the killing was not justified from Yaacob's "totally disproportionate actions".

== 2000s ==
=== "Z", the hired teen killer of Anthony Ler (2001) ===
On 18 May 2001, four days after the murder of 30-year-old insurance agent Annie Leong Wai Mun, police investigators received a confession from a 15-year-old bespectacled and physically lanky boy, who confessed to killing Leong out of guilt, and he said he did it under the orders and manipulation of Leong's 34-year-old husband, Anthony Ler Wee Teang. Ler was arrested following the boy's confession and faced a charge of abetting the boy to murder his wife, which, like murder, would warrant the mandatory death penalty if found guilty. The boy, who was not named in the media as he was below 16, was charged with murder. To protect his identity, court documents and the media referred to the boy as "Z". Ler insisted on his innocence throughout, and he was shown smiling throughout the court proceedings and in the media.

Z and Ler stood trial in November 2001 for murder. It was revealed in the trial that while pending their divorce, Ler had concocted the plan to kill his wife in order to gain custody of their then-four-year-old daughter, and to gain ownership of their flat. Ler was also said to be facing financial problems incurred by his failed business ventures and gambling addiction, for which he was desperate to pay off by selling the flat he and his wife bought under both their names. Ler had also approached five male teenagers, including Z, and offered them money - a price of $100,000 - and some pretty girls. Z, who was initially agreeing to the plan but wanting to back out due to his reluctance to commit murder, was also being threatened by Ler that he would be killed and so do his parents and two other siblings should he not comply to Ler's demands to murder his wife. The prosecution's case was mostly based on what Z told the police in his handwritten confession and police statements. Subhas Anandan, the lawyer representing Ler, sought to prove his client's innocence and discredit Z's account of what happened and tried to paint the teenager as a cold-blooded killer who was willing to implicate an innocent person in a crime he never committed.

Ler was subsequently found guilty of abetment of murder and sentenced to death by the High Court on 5 December 2001. After losing his appeals, he was hanged on 13 December 2002. Z, who was convicted of murder on the same day of Ler's sentencing, was spared the gallows since he was not 18 years old and so he was detained indefinitely at TPP. Tay Yong Kwang, the judge who convicted Z and sentenced him, stated that he did not believe Subhas Anandan's claims that Z was a cold-blooded murderer, but described the boy as a "a morose and mortified teenager who is still trying to come to terms with the cataclysmic events of the last seven months", stating that Z, being truthful in his account, would not be able to concoct "such an elaborate and consistent yarn" or to manipulate the information to his own advantage. During the next 17 years of his life in prison, Z passed both his GCE O-levels and A-levels and obtained a university degree.

Z was released on 2 November 2018 after he was granted clemency by President Halimah Yacob. Z was also told to adhere to special conditions like curfew hours and electronic monitoring, and he would continue to receive rehabilitative support to ensure his reintegration into society. In addition, a gag order remains in force to protect his identity due to his age at the time of the murder.

=== Boon Suan Ban (2005) ===
On 19 March 2005, 53-year-old Boon Suan Ban was acquitted of criminal defamation and sentenced to indefinite detention at TPP. He was said to have defamed Chief Justice Yong Pung How by making an allegation of the obstruction of justice on the part of the Chief Justice. Boon, who was brought to court for this offence, was found to be suffering from paranoid schizophrenia, which caused him to be of unsound mind during the time he committed the offences, which in return produced a verdict that ordered Boon to serve indefinite detention under TPP.

=== Muhammad Nasir Abdul Aziz (2007) ===
On 1 July 2007, 29-year-old Manap Sarlip was found murdered outside his flat at Whampoa. The police investigations led to the arrest of the killer, 17-year-old Muhammad Nasir Abdul Aziz, and Manap's 24-year-old wife Aniza Essa, who ordered and manipulated Nasir to kill Manap. Both of them were charged with murder and abetment of murder respectively.

Nasir, the younger of two sons in his family, was born in September 1990. According to media reports which covered his trial and his lawyer Subhas Anandan, Nasir's mother abandoned his family while he was an infant, and it was his aunt who took care of him. He left school in Secondary 3 due to his desire to support his family and take care of his father, who was suffering from poor health. It was in 2006 when he first met Aniza at a pub where he was a regular customer. They began an affair after he started working as a bartender at that same pub in February 2007. Nasir was said to have fallen in love with Aniza, whom he regarded as the most beautiful woman he ever seen. Later on, Aniza manipulated and asked Nasir if he could help kill her husband Manap, who had been abusive towards her. Nasir, who was repeatedly threatened by Aniza that she would leave him if he did not kill Manap, went ahead with the plan with the fear of losing her, and succeeded after a few failed attempts.

After their arrests, Aniza admitted there was a plot between Nasir and herself to kill her but placed the entire blame on Nasir, whom she portrayed as the mastermind of the murder plot. As for Nasir, he flared up and admitted to the killing and the reason he did it was because he deeply loved Aniza and he was afraid of losing her. The police accepted Nasir's version of what happened and thus charged Aniza for abetting and soliciting Manap's murder. However, Aniza was spared the death penalty as she was found to be suffering from depression at the time of the offence and thus on 28 April 2008, despite the urgings of the prosecution for a life sentence, High Court judge Chan Seng Onn sentenced Aniza to nine years' imprisonment for a reduced charge of culpable homicide not amounting to murder. On 20 April 2009, the prosecution's appeal to increase Aniza's sentence to life imprisonment was dismissed by the Court of Appeal.

Nasir, who was represented by veteran lawyer Subhas Anandan, pleaded guilty to murder in April 2008. Aside from that, a psychiatric report certified that he was deeply regretful of his actions and felt angered at Aniza for manipulating him. He was sentenced to serve time at TPP by judge Kan Ting Chiu. Nasir was the last underaged criminal convicted of a capital offence to be imprisoned under TPP, due to the abolition of TPP for underaged offenders who commit capital crimes in 2010. Nasir is currently in prison serving his sentence.

The case of Nasir was recorded in The Best I Could, Subhas Anandan's memoir. In the memoir, Anandan compared the case as similar to that of his former client Anthony Ler, who also manipulated a teenager to murder his wife, and he wrote that it was ridiculous and unfair that his young client Nasir, who was clearly manipulated by Aniza, whom Subhas described as a "manipulative monster" in his book, had to pay a very heavy price for what he had done while Aniza herself, as the mastermind, escaped with a light punishment, reflecting his sympathy for the youth and his disappointment over the lack of compassion from the law and prosecutors, who refused to agree to his requests to reduce Nasir's murder charge in light of his youth and other mitigating factors of the case. Anandan also wrote in his book, revealing that the boy had written a touching letter to the judge and asked for a chance to reform and confided to Anandan his intention to continue his studies in prison; some excerpts of Nasir's handwritten letter was reproduced in the memoir. The book was subsequently adapted into a television series of the same name, with one episode re-enacting the case of Nasir and Anandan himself narrating some details of the case. This re-enactment marked the second time the case was re-enacted on-screen since Crimewatch in 2010.

== 2010s ==
=== Mohamed Redha Abdul Mutalib (2012) ===
On 26 January 2012, 30-year-old Mohamed Redha Abdul Mutalib murdered his 56-year-old mother Asnah Aziz by stabbing her multiple times with two kitchen knives. Redha was later arrested and charged with murder. Psychiatric assessments revealed that he was suffering from substance-induced psychotic disorder (as a result of his addiction to and intoxication by cough syrup and dextromethorphan), which caused him to experience delusions. He was deemed to be of unsound mind when he killed his mother. On 15 January 2014, nearly two years after the murder, judge Tay Yong Kwang acquitted Redha of murder on the grounds of temporary insanity, and sentenced him to be taken to the Institute of Mental Health, where he would serve indefinite detention under TPP.

=== Tan Kok Meng (2015) ===
On the evening of 13 November 2015, many residents of a flat in Bedok North heard loud arguments coming from a unit on the fourth floor. When police officers arrived at the unit, they found an elderly man lying motionless with head injuries. The elderly man, 75-year-old Tan Ah Hin, was pronounced dead at 6:37pm after arriving at Changi General Hospital. The man's 41-year-old son, Tan Kok Meng, who was together in the flat with his father at the time of the police's arrival at the flat, was placed under arrest and charged with murder. An autopsy found that the victim died as a result of both strangulation and blood aspiration. His face, chest and arms were covered with bruises, and his tongue has a deep cut which bled massively due to being punched in the face.

After spending five long years in remand awaiting trial, a 46-year-old Tan Kok Meng was finally brought to trial in August 2020 for the murder of his father. However, at the beginning of the trial, the High Court was presented with medical reports from two psychiatrists, Cheow Enquan and Subhash Gupta of the Institute of Mental Health, who had assessed Tan during the time of his psychiatric remand and certified that Tan was suffering from schizophrenia and was of unsound mind at the time of the murder. Despite this, the murder charge was not reduced and the prosecution sought a sentence of indefinite detention under TPP, which would be warranted should Tan be found guilty of murder.

On 3 November 2020, Tan was found guilty of murder by the High Court as he was found to be responsible for the mortal blows inflicted upon his father and those led to his father's death. However, judge Valerie Thean acquitted Tan of murder despite finding him guilty, due to the fact that he was of unsound mind when he murdered his father. Hence, he was sentenced to indefinite imprisonment under TPP. Tan would be serving his sentence at a mental facility or a prison or some other safe place in custody. Tan's appeal was later dismissed on 4 May 2021.

=== Gabriel Lien Goh (2019) ===
On 27 October 2019, 22-year-old Gabriel Lien Goh, who earlier consumed LSD, suffered from acute hallucinogen intoxication, which caused him to experience illusions, hallucinations and paranoid delusions in the aftermath of the consumption. Under the influence of drugs, Goh later attacked his mother and grandmother and the Goh family's Javanese maid, using a knife to stab his mother Lee Soh Mui (aged 56) to death. He later chased his grandmother See Keng Keng (aged 90) to his neighbour's house, and assaulted his grandmother until she died from her injuries. With the intervention of several passers-by, Goh was restrained at the void deck below his flat and he was arrested after one of the passers-by contacted the police. Initially charged with murder, Goh's charges were reduced to culpable homicide by the time he first turned up to court for trial on 23 September 2022.

The psychiatric reports revealed that Goh was mentally unsound at the time of the killings, as a result of the effects of drugs and drug-induced hallucinations, and he was unable to recall how he killed his mother and grandmother despite acknowledging his responsibility for one of their deaths. As such, on 23 September 2022, the trial judge Valerie Thean decided to acquit Goh of culpable homicide on the grounds of unsound mind following the prosecution's submissions, and sentenced him to serve detention under the President's Pleasure.

== 2020s ==
=== Geylang mother case (2021) ===
On 11 August 2021, a 35-year-old Singaporean woman was arrested for murdering her eight-year-old eldest daughter. To avoid identification of her then four-year-old youngest daughter, the woman was not named due to a gag order.

The mother was assessed to be suffering from schizophrenia, which first surfaced several years earlier but went undetected and untreated. She began to behave strangely and hear voices inside her head; as she deteriorated, she experienced a psychotic episode and killed her eldest daughter by inflicting 64 knife wounds (including two fatal abdominal wounds), because the voices in her head had convinced her that the girl was an evil ghost and asked her to attack her daughter.

The prosecution argued that the mother's psychiatric condition rendered her mentally unsound and caused her to be unable to differentiate between right and wrong, as well as losing touch with reality, and thus urged the court to acquit her and detain her under the President's Pleasure. Veteran criminal lawyer Choo Si Sen and another lawyer Choo Yean Lin, who both represented the mother in trial court, did not challenge the prosecution's case and agreed with the prosecution based on the psychiatric evidence submitted to the court.

On 20 September 2022, Justice Valerie Thean of the High Court granted the mother an acquittal on the grounds of an unsound mind despite the mother's plea of guilt to the murder charge, which allowed the mother to avoid both the death penalty and life imprisonment. The judge ordered her to be detained indefinitely under the President's Pleasure, in which she would be imprisoned for an indefinite period of time until she was deemed mentally fit for release and return to society.

== Response ==
=== Underaged offenders ===
In 2004, Paul Quan, a state prosecutor, wrote a paper detailing a 15-year-old teenager jailed under the TPP for killing an insurance agent at the urging of her husband Anthony Ler. Quan, who became a district judge four years later, argued that it was a very severe punishment to sentence the teenager to indefinite imprisonment, which was opposite to the Children and Young Persons Act (CYPA), which empowers a judge with discretion to sentence a youth offender to an appropriate sentence, since such an act allows a fixed jail term for underaged criminals who commit murder or other heinous crimes. Quan felt that such a discretion should be given since Tay Yong Kwang, the judge who found the boy guilty, had made a positive illustration of the boy's personality. Tay had stated that the boy was not cold-blooded but was manipulated by an adult and simple-minded, with too much conscience, etc. Quan also argued that the TPP should be reserved to those underaged offenders who commit the most devious of capital crimes. The paper was published in a 2004 Singapore Academy of Law journal.

Chan Wing Cheong, an associate professor of law at the National University of Singapore, stated that there is a "conflict between sentencing options" from his opinion, and he opined that a review was necessary. He also suggested that the President's Pleasure should be abolished. In a letter he wrote to the Straits Times in April 2008, he wrote, "A defined term of imprisonment offers more hope to young persons and therefore assists in rehabilitation."

Subhas Anandan, the president of the Association of Criminal Lawyers of Singapore, agreed that the options of sentences available to the youth offenders should be reviewed, and given that the Criminal Procedure Code was undergoing a review on that same year itself, he urged that this review should be done at that moment. Anandan, who represented Muhammad Nasir Abdul Aziz, an underaged offender who was detained at the TPP for murdering his lover's husband in that same year, also said in his own words, "From the inmate's point of view, not knowing exactly when he could be released is a form of punishment in itself."

On the other hand, Teo Ho Pin, chairman of the Parliamentary Committee for Law and Home Affairs, stated that the practice of TPP for underaged offenders should remain. He said that the youth offenders who commit capital crimes should not expect themselves to be escaping from severe punishments, citing that it sent a strong message of deterrence to the young.

== Abolition ==
=== Underaged offenders ===
In 2010, the law was amended so that offenders who were convicted of capital offences but were under 18 years old at the time of the commission of their crimes would be sentenced to life imprisonment instead of the President's Pleasure. They are required to serve at least 20 years before they can be reviewed for possible release.

As a result of the amended law, 17-year-old Zin Mar Nwe, a Myanmar maid who murdered her employer's mother-in-law in June 2018, became the first person to be sentenced to life imprisonment in July 2023 (13 years after the 2010 legal reform) for committing murder while she was still a minor at the time of the offence.

=== Considerations to amend TPP practice for offenders of unsound mind ===
In early 2018, it was reported that there are considerations made by the Ministry of Law of Singapore to make amendments to the second form of the TPP practice, which was still in practice for offenders of unsound mind. There were also discussions to set a maximum detention period for such offenders and to allow regular court review of the confinement.

== See also ==
- Capital punishment in Singapore
- At His Majesty's pleasure
- List of major crimes in Singapore
- Changi Prison
