= Crime in Singapore =

Criminal Activity in Singapore

Singapore

Crime rates* (2023)

Physical Crimes
- Theft/related crimes: 145
- Crimes against persons: 79
- Commercial crimes: 49
- Housebreaking/related crimes: 3
- Violent/serious property crimes: 1
- Total physical crimes: 337

Scams & Cybercrimes
- Total Scams/cybercrimes: 851
- *Per 100,000 population. Est. total population ('000) 5,917.6

Crime rates in Singapore are some of the lowest in the world, with petty crimes such as pickpocketing and street theft rarely occurring, and violent crime being extremely rare. Penalties for drug offences such as trafficking in Singapore are severe, and include the death penalty.

In 2022, Singapore ranked first as the safest country or area in the Global Law and Order Index. It was also ranked the third safest city in 2021 by the Economist Intelligence Unit, and 24th safest out of 136 countries in the Global Organized Crime Index by the Global Initiative Against Transnational Organized Crime.

== Criminal & civil proceedings ==
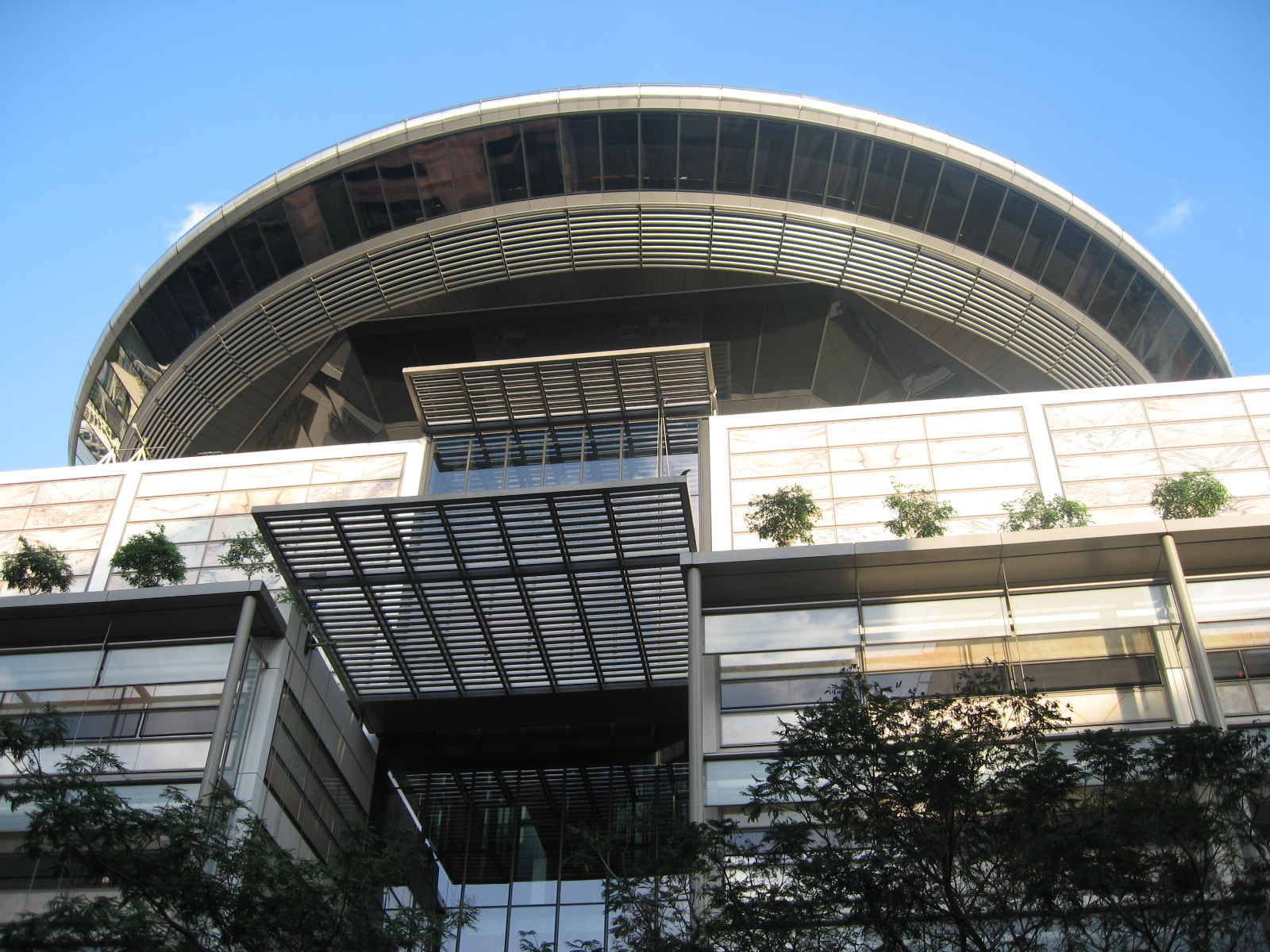
Supreme Court Building

Singapore has indoctrinated strong rule of law and their civil and criminal justice systems have consistently performed well over the years. In the World Justice Report 2021 by the World Justice Project, it was ranked 17th out of 139 countries (scoring 8th place in civil justice, 7th place in criminal justice, 4th place in regulatory enforcement and 3rd place in absence of corruption).

== Statistics ==
The total number of physical crimes remains low in 2023. The total number of cases tracked down from 25,633 cases (2018) to an average of 19,750 cases (2020–2023).

Categories	2018	2019	2020	2021	2022	2023
Theft & Related Crimes						
No of Cases	12,196	11,128	7,437	6,843	7,878	8,572
Per 100,000 population	216	195	131	125	140	145
Housebreaking & Related Crimes						
No of Cases	328	281	210	160	163	191
Per 100,000 population	6	5	4	3	3	3
Violent/Serious Crimes^{1}						
No of Cases	210	153	305	469	60	63
Per 100,000 population	4	3	5	9	1	1
Crimes against persons^{2}						
No of Cases	5,031	4,349	4,602	4,878	4,869	4,673
Per 100,000 population	89	76	81	89	86	79
Commercial Crimes^{3}						
No of Cases	9,416	12,710	17,123	25,871	3,260^{3}	2,921
Per 100,000 population	167	223	301	474	58^{3}	49
Miscellaneous Crimes^{4}						
No of Cases	5,945	6,494	7,596	7,975	3,963	3,546
Per 100,000 population	105	114	134	146	70^{4}	60
Physical Crimes^{5}						
No of Cases	25,633	23,980	19,498	19,343	20,193	19,966
Per 100,000 population	455	420	343	355	358	337
Scams/cybercrimes						
No of Cases	6,234	9,545	15,651	23,933	33,669	50,376
Per 100,000 population	111	167	275	439	597	851

Sources: Based on SPF Annual Reports, S'pore National Statistical Office.

Notes: ^{1}Mainly robberies and extortion cases; ^{2}Refers to crimes where victims suffer bodily harm such as in murders, serious assault/hurt, rape, outrage of modesty and rioting; ^{3}Comprises commercial and financial white collar crimes [2018-2021] includes scams [From 2022] scams relegated to separate category; ^{4}Miscellaneous cases such as affray, mischief, weapon possession, causing hurt and vandalism [2018-2021] includes cybercrimes [From 2022] cybercrimes relegated to separate category; ^{5}Does not include scams/cybercrimes.

=== 2023 ===
On a year-on-year basis, physical crime cases decreased (1.1%) from 20,193 cases (2022) to 19,966 cases (2023). The crimes of concern were shop theft, theft in dwelling, outrage of modesty and voyeurism. Shop thefts and voyeurism were among the cases that showed an uptrend. The rise in shop theft came after the widespread adoption of self-checkout counters in supermarkets. Most of the voyeurism and outrage of modesty cases were perpetrated by persons known to victims, in residential and public settings.

Physical Crime Cases	2021	2022	2023
Outrage of Modesty	1,474	1,610	1,528
% Change	—	+9.2%	-5.1%
Voyeurism	467	424	476
% Change	—	-9.2%	+12.3%
Shop Theft	2,652	3,244	3,939
% Change	—	+22.3%	+21.4%
Theft in Dwelling	1,359	1,729	1,695
% Change	—	+27.2%	-2.0%
Rioting	46	60	—
% Change	—	+30%	—
Others	13,345	13,126	—
% Change	—	—	—
Total	19,343	20,193	19,966
% Change	—	+4.4%	-1.1%

For traffic related offences:

Traffic Related Offences	2021	2022
Red Light Running Violations	44,745	43,687
% Change	—	—
Speeding Violations	139,276	125,189
% Change	—	—
Red Light Running resulting in Accidents	136	132
% Change	—	—
Speeding resulting in Accidents	984	1,124
% Change	—	+14.2%

== Scams ==
Scams and cybercrime continue to be a key concern in the city state. From 2016 to 2023, the number of reported scam cases experienced an eight-fold increase from 5,300 to over 46,000 cases. As a crime of concern, the Singapore Police Force has separated scams from its annual crime number statistics.

Scams/cybercrimes	2018	2019	2020	2021	2022	2023
No of Cases	6,234	9,545	15,651	23,933	31,728	46,563
% Change	—	+53.1%	+64.0%	+52.9%	+32.6%	+46.8%
Losses ($Mil)	151.4	170.8	265.7	632.0	660.7	651.8
% Change	—	+12.8%	+55.6%	+137.9%	+4.5%	-1.3%

Since 2022, the majority of crime reports has been attributed to scams. On a year-on-year basis, there were 46,563 reported scam cases in 2023, up from 31,728 cases in 2022 (46.8% increase). Since 2019, more than S$2.3 billion has been lost to scams. Annual losses of more than $650 million were recorded in both 2022 and 2023.

The top five reported scams by number of cases were related to jobs (9,914 cases), e-commerce (9,783 cases), fake friend call (6,859 cases), phishing (5,938 cases), and investment-related (4,030 cases). The phishing scams often involve malware installed on victims' Android devices to steal banking credentials.

The top five reported scam cases in terms of monetary losses were related to investment ($204.5 million), job scams ($135.7 million), government impersonation ($92.5 million), internet love ($39.8 million), and malware enabled ($34.1 million).

In the first three months of 2026, The Straits Times reported more than 7,800 scam cases and losses exceeding S$144.4 million, including phishing scams involving fake buyers on online marketplaces in January, e-commerce pre-order scams in February, and impersonation scams involving educational institutions in March.

=== Countermeasures ===
To combat the rising incidence of scams, the Singapore authorities had implemented various counter measures to combat scams and reinstating money back to victims.

In 2019, the Anti-Scam Centre was formed under Commercial Affairs Department (CAD) in 2019 and was reorganised into the Anti-Scam Division in 2021. In March 2022, the Anti-Scam Command (ASCom) was formed to include the Anti-Scam Centre and three Anti-Scam Investigation Branches. ASCom also oversees the Scam Strike Teams managed by the seven Police Land Divisions.

Other initiatives and measures include the following:

1. Amended the Drug Trafficking and Other Serious Crimes (Confiscation of Benefits) Act (CDSA), Computer Misuse Act (CMA) and introduced Online Criminals Harm Act (OCHA) in 2023
2. Launched and refreshed the anti-scam campaign
3. Collaborating with law enforcement agencies in Hong Kong, Macau and Malaysia to deal with transnational scams
4. Launched ScamShield app for iOS and Android phone users
5. Deploying bank staff to expedite the process of identifying and freezing fraudulent transactions and accounts
6. Maintaining a SMS Sender ID Registry under the Infocomm Media Development Authority to flag potential scam messages
7. Prescribed a shared liability framework (with financial and telecommunication companies) to manage losses incurred by phishing scams

=== Notable cases ===
High-profile scam cases in Singapore include the following:

Subject	Period	Perpetuators	Losses	#Victims	Description
Nickel Investment Fraud Scheme	2017-2021	Ng Yu Zhi, (conspirators: Keeran Marcus Phang Guan Wei, Alvin Oey Wei Zhong & Ding Kuon Chwo)	$1.5 billion	300	Alleged ponzi scheme touted at 15% quarterly gains with fake nickel transactions through the incorporated companies "Envy Global Trading" and "Envy Asset Management". Ng faces 105 criminal charges and is currently awaiting trial.
Sunshine Empire Ponzi	2006-2007	James Phang Wah, (conspirators: Jackie Hoo Choon Cheat & Neo Kuon Huay)	$190 million	20,000	MLM and ponzi scheme touted at multi-X% returns that marketed lifestyle packages through the incorporated company "Sunshine Empire".
Maxim Trader Compensation Plan	2013-2015	Andrew Lim Ann Hoe, Chin Ming Kam & Goh Seow Mooi	>$50 million	2,000	MLM and ponzi scheme touted at 6-8% returns with fund management services in leveraged foreign exchange through the incorporated (New Zealand) company "Maxim Capital".
OneCoin Promotion	2015-2019	Terence Lim Yoong Fook & Fok Fook Seng	Unknown	2,349	MLM and ponzi scheme that marketed educational packages bundled with OneCoin mining tokens through the incorporated company "OneConcept".
Training Grants	2017	Ng Cheng Kwee, Sim Soon Lee, Lee Lai Leng, David Lim Wee Hong & eight other operatives	$39.9 million	–	Syndicate that submitted fraudulent claims for training grants to SkillsFuture Singapore through nine shell companies when no training has been conducted between April and August 2017. S$21.3 million of public funds was laundered away and remains unaccountable.
Tradenation Luxury Goods	2021-2022	Pi Jiapeng & Pansuk Siriwipa	$32 million	180	Alleged cheating through the falsified consignment sales of luxury watches and handbags. The couple were arrested while on the run and are currently awaiting trial. The companies "Tradenation" and "Tradeluxury" were incorporated to trade in luxury goods in April 2021 and the former was registered as a precious stones and precious metals dealer in April 2022.
OCBC Bank Phishing	2022	Suspected overseas syndicates, (conspirators: Brayden Cheng Ming Yan, Kong Jia Quan, Jovan Soh Jun Yan, Roy Peh Yong Rong, Muhummad Khairuddin Eskandariah, Lim Kai Ze & Leong Jun Xia)	$13.7 million	469,790	Spoofed SMS to collect online banking log-in credentials through phishing websites. Money was laundered to suspected overseas syndicates by conspirators. The bank made reparations on goodwill basis. The MAS imposed additional capital requirements on the bank amounting to S$300 million.
Car Deposit Scam	2014	Koh Chek Seng, (conspirators: Alvin Loo Mun Yu, Jason Koh Chi Kang)	$6.2 million	182	Collected deposits for falsified sales in parallel imported cars through the incorporated company "Volks Auto". To keep up the charade, several luxury cars were put on display in the showroom.
Investment Fraud Scam	2011-2021	Low Mood Chay	$1.39 million	Unknown	Cheated several acquaintances through fake investment schemes that touted high dividends.
Relationship Scam	2016-2021	Joselyn Kwek Sok Koon, (conspirator: Lai Sze Yin)	$880,000	10	Cheated various people through ruses and deceits including the promise of romantic relationships.
Stock Scheme	2014-2020	Rafiq Shamoon Omer	$714,000	3	Cheated acquaintances with stock schemes (2014–2018) and credit card charges (2020). He is a Dutch-national S'pore resident with prior US wire fraud conviction (2004) and further alleged to have defrauded millions from US investment firms with pre-IPO share offers (2020).
Airbnb Rental Scam	2022	Gibson Zeng Xianfu	$383,000	68	Collected deposits for fake rental listings with victims from at least 12 countries.
Renovation Scam	2020	Huang Ruixiang	$160,000	40	Misappropriated money for renovation projects after doing partial renovation work through the incorporated company "SG Venture Furnishing". Also duped victims through a fake investment scheme.
Sg Tinder Swindler	2018-2021	Jerald Low Jing Yong	>$150,000	10	Fabricated an image of wealth and opulence to cultivate trust from friends and associates, thereby inducing them to give him money.
Carousell Scam	2021-2022	Nicholas Ong Chang Hui	$148,000	128	Collected deposits for fake pre-orders of Apple laptops, iPhones and PlayStation consoles as well as the fake sale of a Rolex watch.
Carousell Scam	2019	Caine Poh Zhenglong	$108,000	396	Collected proceeds from false sales of various items, most of which were tickets to attractions. Fraudulent Carousell accounts were created by duping jobseekers.

==== Multi-level marketing schemes ====
Multi-level marketing (MLM) or pyramid selling are illegal under the jurisdiction unless approved by the Direct Selling Association of Singapore, after having met specific exclusion criteria to protect consumers and participants. A MLM may evolve into a ponzi scheme where the "new income", generated by attracting new or successive participants to provide funds, are marked as "profits" and used to provide "returns" for the older or preceding participants.

=== Transnational crimes ===
The key transnational crimes affecting Singapore and the region are driven by scams and cybercrime, illicit drug trafficking and terrorism. Over the years, the police have carried out various operations against transnational crime syndicates. Self-radicalised individuals involved in terrorism are dealt with under the Internal Security Act. There have also been reports of Singaporeans abducted by criminal gangs to work in scam centres in Myanmar, Cambodia, Laos, Philippines and Thailand with the lure of overseas job postings.

==== Operations ====
The Singapore Police has taken action against transnational crime syndicates on its own or in combined operations with the Royal Malaysia Police:

1. Thirteen transnational scam syndicates with the arrest of more than seventy persons (2022).
2. Home rental scams that incurred $1.3 million losses from 480 victims (2023). The number of home rental scams was known to have increased from 192 cases (2021) to 979 cases (2022).
3. A "fake friend call" syndicate that incurred over $1.3 million losses from over 490 victims (2022–2023).
4. Money laundering cells that incurred over $1.3 million losses from 60 victims (2023).

== Commercial crimes ==
As a leading financial hub that ranks third in the Global Financial Centres Index 2022, Singapore is not immune to financial and corporate crime. Commercial crime includes insider dealing and market abuse, bribery and corruption, money laundering and terrorist financing. Since March 2015, financial crimes are investigated collaboratively by the Commercial Affairs Department (CAD) and the Monetary Authority of Singapore (MAS) to detect, investigate and deal with any misconduct. In May 2023, new offences concerning rash and negligent money laundering were added to the CDSA. Notable commercial crime cases include the following:

1. The share prices of three companies - Asiansons Capital, Blumont Group and LionGold Corp were manipulated causing their share prices to collapse and two financial institutions were also cheated from August 2012 to October 2013.
2. There was an alleged conspiracy to bribe (US$55 million) officials of Brazilian company Petrobras by six senior management staff of Keppel O&M from 2001 to 2014 . Keppel O&M agreed to pay more than US$422 million to resolve the charges. The six staff were issued stern warnings for the bribery-related offences.
3. There were breaches of anti-money laundering and countering financing of terrorism requirements (AML/CFT) by Standard Chartered Bank (S'pore) and Standard Chartered Trust (S'pore) from December 2015 to January 2016. The companies were fined S$5.2 million and S$1.2 million respectively.
4. There were breaches of anti-money laundering regulations since the 1MDB scandal broke. Eight banks in Singapore were subjected to fines of up to S$29.1 million. The BSI Bank and Falcon Private Bank (S'pore) were closed.
5. In findings reported by the United Nations (UN), US$254 million worth of arms and raw materials to manufacture weapons were shipped to Myanmar military through Singapore based entities from February 2021 to December 2022. The report said that the Singapore banks have been "used extensively by arms dealers" and that "substantial reserves" of Myanmar are suspected to be held in DBS, UOB and OCBC Banks. In response to the UN report, the Singapore Authorities said that it will not hesitate to take action against any individual or entity that contravenes its laws. According to the UN, about 3,000 civilians have been killed by the Myanmar military since the coup, including more than 200 children.

=== Money laundering ===
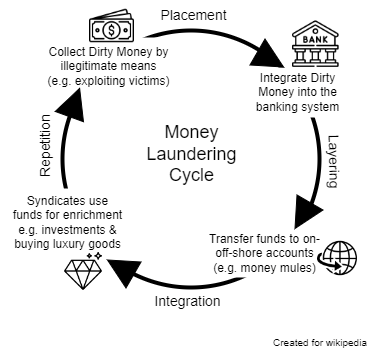
Money Laundering Cycle

From 2020 to 2022, at least 240 people were convicted of money laundering offences (largely related to domestic scams) and a total of $1.2 billion worth of assets were seized. In August 2023, the police arrested ten foreign nationals on suspicion of committing offences such as forgery and money laundering. Over $2.8 billion worth of assets were seized and/or subjected to prohibition of disposal orders in raids across the country: 152 properties and 62 vehicles (>$1.24 billion), cash in bank accounts (>$1.45 billion), cash of various currencies (>$76 million), thousands of bottles of wine and spirits, cryptocurrencies (>$38 million), 68 gold bars, 294 luxury bags, 164 branded watches and 546 pieces of jewelry.

== Drug related offences ==
The global shift in attitudes toward drugs has also led to the liberalisation of drug policies in some countries, as evident in the decriminalisation and/or legalisation of cannabis in Thailand and some states in the United States. Due to its proximity to major producing countries (e.g. Golden Triangle) in the illegal drug trade (worth about 1% of total global trade), Singapore is also vulnerable to the inflow of drugs.

=== 2022 ===
The number of drug abusers arrested increased 4% from 2,729 cases (2021) to 2,826 cases (2022). The Central Narcotics Bureau highlighted trends of increased cannabis seizures and a growing number of new cannabis users below the age of 30 years, with some as young as 14. Some of the users were involved in drug trafficking. Methamphetamine, heroin, cannabis and ecstasy were among the four most commonly abused drugs in Singapore. The estimated market value of drugs seized is $16.66 million. In the Misuse of Drug Act (MDA), 13 new psychoactive substances were added to the Class A controlled drugs schedule. There were a total of 11 judiciary hangings all for drug related offences.

Arrests*	2018	2019	2020	2021	2022
No of drug abusers	3,439	3,526	3,056	2,729	2,826

source: *CNB annual reports, https://www.cnb.gov.sg

== Human trafficking ==
Singapore is a transit and destination country for human trafficking. Individuals trafficked from other South and South-east Asian countries are often rendered vulnerable to sex or labour exploitation through various means. Regarding human smuggling, Singapore has seen a decrease in cases as authorities have become better at detecting concealed individuals at land and sea checkpoints. However, at the same time, criminal organisations have developed more sophisticated methods of human smuggling, including the procurement of genuine and fraudulent travel documents.

Some of the 849,700 foreign work permit holders who constitute almost one-quarter of Singapore's labour force are at risk of trafficking. Most victims migrate willingly for work in construction, domestic service, performing arts, manufacturing, the service industry, or commercial sex but may later face exploitation in these sectors. To migrate, many workers assume large debts to recruitment agents in their home countries and sometimes in Singapore, placing them at risk for debt bondage. Foreign workers from countries with a small presence in Singapore can experience language barriers that increase their isolation.

Traffickers compel foreign workers into sex trafficking or forced labour through threats of forced repatriation without pay, restrictions on movement, physical and sexual abuse, and withholding wages and travel documents, such as passports. Some recruitment agencies illegally engage in contract switching and charge workers fees more than the legal limit. Foreign workers have credible fears of losing their work visas and being deported, since employers have the ability to repatriate workers legally at any time during their contracts with minimal notice. Unscrupulous employers exploit the limited transferability of low-skilled work visas to control or manipulate workers.

Reports indicate that some fishing vessel captains of long-haul boats that transit or dock at Singaporean ports use physical abuse to force men to perform labour. A small number of Singapore residents facilitate and engage in child sex tourism abroad.

== Abuse of vulnerable persons ==
The protection of vulnerable persons from domestic violence comes under the charter of the Ministry of Social and Family Development (MSF).

=== Child abuse ===
In 2021, there were over 2,000 cases of child abuse investigated by MSF's Child Protective Services in Singapore. MSF said that the increase in the number of cases from 2015 onwards was attributed to the introduction of more rigorous screening tools and training to spot such cases of abuse for professionals working with children, such as educators, social workers, counsellors, and health professionals.

Investigated Cases	2012	2013	2014	2015	2016	2017	2018	2019	2020	2021
Physical Abuse	171	148	161	263	444	373	584	660	677	788
Sexual Abuse	70	60	56	82	107	181	248	210	261	443
Neglect	136	135	164	206	322	340	331	218	375	910
Total	383	343	381	551	873	894	1,163	1,088	1,313	2,141

=== Elderly abuse ===
The number of cases of elderly abuse have also been increasing over the years.

Known Cases	2019	2020	2021
High Risk	85	71	39
Total	232	283	338

== Crimes related to foreign workers ==
In 2014, the government explained during a parliamentary sitting that between 2009 and 2013, there were more than 18,000 persons arrested out of which 20% were foreigners. The arrest rates for foreigners were 272 per 10,000 persons while the arrest rate for residents were 385 per 10,000 persons.

In a 2019 report Public Attitudes Towards Migrant Workers in Japan, Malaysia, Singapore and Thailand by the International Labour Organisation (ILO) and the United Nations Women, a majority (52%) of survey respondents in Singapore felt that crime rates have increased due to immigration although there is little direct evidence to back up the claims. The findings suggested that programmes and policies be put in place to encourage interaction and community engagement of foreign workers and discourage exclusion, isolation and discrimination practices.

According to the Ministry of Manpower (MOM), an average of 270 reports of abuse involving migrant domestic workers (MDWs) were made to the police each year between 2017 and 2020.

== Traffic offences ==
Serious traffic offences involving death, injury or damage to public property fall under the jurisdiction of criminal law in Singapore. In 1985, the legal alcohol limit has been revised from 0.11% to 0.08% BAC. The number of accidents and arrests related to drink driving are given in the table below. In other developments, cyclists who break road rules such as non-conformance to group size, failing to stop at red lights, riding abreast of another cyclist on single lane roads and cycling on expressways are subject to higher compositions fines or imprisonment, effective from January 2022.

Drink Driving	2018	2019	2020	2021	2022
No of Fatal Accidents	11	7	13	8	10
No of Accidents	178	162	146	155	175
No of Arrests	1,685	1,453	1,517	1,987	2,038

== Failure to report a crime ==
Under §424 and §202 of the Criminal Procedure Code, it is a legal duty binding upon any person who has knowledge or reason to believe or suspect that a crime has been committed, to submit a police report (or witness report where applicable). The failure to act in accordance with the aforementioned will render the person to be liable to the charge of perverting or obstructing justice.

== Crime deterrence ==
The National Crime Prevention Council of Singapore maintains a web portal Scam Alert that offers scam prevention campaign posters and also encourages victims to come forward to share their stories.

The Neighbourhood Watch Zone scheme was formed on 27 April 1997 and today includes the Citizens On Patrol (COP) initiative, which conducts regular foot patrol with community policing. Officers go around each neighbourhood to project police presence and to disseminate crime prevention pamphlet to the residents.

The Ministries of Law and Home Affairs said that the death penalty is an effective deterrent when it comes to the most serious crimes, including the trafficking of significant quantities of drugs as well as crimes such as murder.

Number of judiciary hangings

Type	2007	2008	2009	2010	2011	2012	2013	2014	2015	2016	2017	2018	2019	2020	2021	2022	2023
Drugs	2	2	3	0	2	0	0	2	3	2	8	11	2	0	0	11	5
Murder	1	4	1	0	2	0	0	0	1	2	0	2	2	0	0	0	0
Firearms	0	0	1	0	0	0	0	0	0	0	0	0	0	0	0	0	0
Total	3	6	5	0	4	0	0	2	4	4	8	13	4	0	0	11	5

== See also ==
- Corruption in Singapore
- Criminal law of Singapore
- List of major crimes in Singapore
- Organised crime in Singapore
- Law of Singapore
