= Teo Cheng Kiat =

Former Singapore Airlines employee and white-collar convict

- Born: 1953 (age 72–73); Singapore
- Occupations: Clerk at the SIA (former; 1975–1988); Cabin crew supervisor at the SIA (former; 1988–2000)
- Status: Released since 2024
- Criminal charges: 26 charges of criminal breach of trust (ten convicted)
- Penalty: A total of 24 years' imprisonment, consisting of four consecutive jail terms of six years

Teo Cheng Kiat (张振杰 Zhāng Zhènjíe; born 1953) is a Singaporean who was known for embezzling $35 million from Singapore Airlines (SIA) while he was still employed there, and the embezzlement lasted for 13 years between 1987 and 2000 before the detection of his criminal deeds and subsequent capture. Teo was charged with 26 charges of criminal breach of trust and corruption but was found guilty of ten charges; he was sentenced to a total of 24 years' imprisonment in the same year he was arrested.

Teo's crime was considered to be the largest financial crime committed in Singapore at the time his arrest and trial was reported. Teo had additionally used his criminal proceeds to spend on himself, building up an expensive lifestyle. His wife, who was an accomplice of his crimes, was convicted and served 18 months in prison. The notoriety of Teo's crime was surpassed by Chia Teck Leng four years later, when Chia was ordered to serve 42 years behind bars for swindling $117 million from four foreign banks to feed his gambling addiction and discharge his debts.

== Early life ==
Teo Cheng Kiat was born in Singapore in 1953.

Teo was Chinese-educated and he completed both his elementary and secondary education in Chinese schools. Teo was later married with two sons, who were born in 1980 and 1984. Teo's elder son later became a Singapore Armed Forces (SAF) scholar while the younger son was completing his GCE O-levels at the time Teo was arrested and sentenced for his crimes. He was known to be a committed family man and model son to his family.

Teo first joined Singapore Airlines (SIA) in May 1975 as a clerk. He stayed on the post for 13 years before his promotion to cabin supervisor in 1988. Teo was regarded as a reliable employee and many trusted him with his efficient and good work performance.

== Criminal conduct ==
Beginning from 9 February 1987, when he was still a clerk at Singapore Airlines (SIA), 34-year-old Teo Cheng Kiat began to misappropriate money from SIA. Teo's misappropriation continued even after he was promoted to cabin crew supervisor from 1 September 1988 onwards.

As cabin crew supervisor, Teo's duty was to oversee the processing of cabin crew allowances, which were to be paid to the cabin crew members. Teo had the right to make adjustments to the allowance system, could determine the name of the crew member who was to be paid, the amount payable and the receiving bank account number. A particular type of allowance (the Meal and Overnight Allowance), which was tax-free and payable only to cabin crew, was processed and paid directly to the cabin crew by Teo's department. Each crew member maintained a bank account with United Overseas Bank (UOB) and the money paid would be transferred by the Bank from the airline's account to the respective crew members’ accounts directly.

Teo was able to exploit this system by using the names of crew members who did not fly on various flights to make false claims and channeled the payments to his own bank accounts. Teo also opened bank accounts under the joint names of his wife and sister-in-law, and also under the joint names of himself and his wife. He made use of these accounts to keep the money he stole from the payments, and used fictitious adjustments for extra payments of allowances to enable him to embezzle money from these payments while maintaining the full due payment of each crew member's allowances. He even amended the computerized reports to enable himself from escaping detection.

Through the embezzlement of the money, Teo accumulated a fortune and he made use of most of them to provide himself and his family with an expensive lifestyle. Teo also bought a total of seven private properties, including his own house; he also did a costly $280,000 worth of renovation of two apartments. He also purchased two cars, a Mercedes-Benz car for $180,000 and a BMW car for $270,570, and even spent $1.85 million on jewellery, designer goods and watches.

== Arrest and imprisonment ==
=== Indictment ===
On 18 January 2000, an ad-hoc internal audit was conducted on the crew allowance payments at Singapore Airlines (SIA), and it detected three UOB bank accounts receiving ten payments each on 15 December 1999. It was unusual as there was supposed to be one payment made per crew member on that day, and the bank accounts were under the name of Teo Cheng Kiat. This suspicious error prompted a report to the Commercial Affairs Department (CAD), who arrested Teo on the same day the detection was made.

Teo was later charged with 26 criminal counts - which consisted of 25 counts of criminal breach of trust and one single charge of corruption. The investigations eventually revealed that Teo had misappropriated a total amount of $35 million, instead of the $2 million as what the SIA initially perceived when they made the complaint to CAD. During the investigations, the police were only able to recover $15 million, but subsequently, Teo decided to surrender his remaining properties back to SIA, which amounted to $6 million; the remaining $14 million were never recovered despite the efforts by the police. Aside from this, Teo was cooperative from the time he was arrested and gave every information he had about his crimes over these 13 years.

=== Guilty plea and submissions ===
In his trial at the High Court of Singapore five months later, on 19 June 2000, Teo Cheng Kiat pleaded guilty to ten charges of criminal breach of trust, and had the remaining 16 charges taken into consideration during sentencing. Each charge of criminal breach of trust carries the maximum penalty of seven years' imprisonment.

The prosecution, consisting of former CAD director Lawrence Ang and his colleague Jeanne Lee from the Attorney-General's Chambers (AGC), submitted that the mitigating factors behind Teo's case were scant, as the misappropriation of money took place daily over a long period of 13 years and the amount he took was massive. They argued that Teo spent a majority of the misappropriated funds on an expensive and high-quality lifestyle, and may have hidden some of the stolen fortune for future spending in the later part of his life. His actions were premeditated and deliberate, and he was in a position of trust and had betrayed the confidence of his employers and his superiors for 13 years. His plea of guilt was only submitted in view of overwhelming evidence and in summary, they sought a deterrent and severe sentence for Teo.

As for the defence, Teo's lawyer Kevin De Souza submitted a mitigation plea that Teo committed the offences out of dissatisfaction towards his employers who looked down on him due to his educational background, and this caused him to not be able to get a promotion to a managerial position despite his diligence, knowledge and efficiency in the job, and they never considered his opinion in rectifying the discovered flaws of the payment system.

These factors resulted into bitterness and anger that led to Teo's criminal spree, and greed later took over his cloud of judgement. He also claimed that he felt sorry towards his wife for manipulating her regarding the bank account and wealth they obtained, as well as towards his superiors for the financial losses suffered by SIA. His status as a first-time offender and timely plea of guilt, in addition to the full cooperation with the authorities were also cited as mitigating factors of the case.

=== Sentence ===
On 30 June 2000, the trial judge, Judicial Commissioner (JC) Tay Yong Kwang of the High Court decided to sentence 47-year-old Teo Cheng Kiat to a total of 24 years’ imprisonment.

Explaining why he meted out a 24-year sentence, JC Tay stated that while Teo's plea of guilt saved the court's time and expense, Teo only did so in front of overwhelming amounts of evidence, in contrast to the guilty pleas made in certain cases of crimes that were difficult to prove. His capture did not result from a voluntary surrender and remorse, but it was due to his criminal conduct being discovered out of luck and coincidence. Hence, the guilty plea carried little weight. Although it was his first conviction, Teo has earned it through a dramatical magnitude of his crime.

JC Tay also stated that the daily misappropriation of money took place in a systematic and sophisticated manner, and under a cleverly hatched concealment, it took place steadily over a long period of time, which serves as an aggravating factor of the case. The judge also pointed out that even if Teo did commit the first few crimes back in 1987 out of anger towards his employers as what he claimed, this has already became a poor excuse for Teo in his subsequent crimes as these crimes were motivated solely by his increasing greed, and Teo used the criminal proceeds to provide himself an extravagant lifestyle and spent them on expensive goods more than what many honest and law-abiding citizens would earn in their lives.

For these reasons, JC Tay declared that Teo should be severely punished for what he did, and stated that a lengthy sentence is necessary to make Teo, who became “intoxicated” with greed, to become sober again. Hence, JC Tay meted out a six-year prison sentence for each of the ten convicted charges. Of these ten prison sentences meted out, four of the terms were to be served consecutively while the remaining six were to be served concurrently.

In total, Teo was to serve 24 years in prison, with effect from the date of his arrest, though the sentence may possibly be reduced by one-third due to good behaviour.

Since 2024, Teo was released from prison.

== Significance of the case ==
In the aftermath of the case, Teo Cheng Kiat's wife was charged in court in July 2001 for dishonestly receiving stolen property - mainly some of the misappropriated funds which her husband had given her. Despite pleading not guilty, Teo's wife was later convicted and sentenced to 18 months’ imprisonment on 16 October 2001. Singapore Airlines also sued Teo's family members, including Teo's sons and sister-in-law, to reclaim the remaining damages they suffered.

At the time he was sentenced, Teo Cheng Kiat was regarded as the perpetrator of Singapore's worst financial crime. Merely four years later, Teo's case was surpassed by Chia Teck Leng, who swindled a total of $117 million from four foreign major banks to feed his gambling addiction during his time as a financial manager at Asia Pacific Breweries (APB). Chia was sentenced to 42 years in jail for his crime.

== See also ==
- List of major crimes in Singapore
- Nick Leeson
- James Phang Wah
- Chia Teck Leng
