= Chia Teck Leng =

Singaporean high-profile white-collar criminal

- Police mugshot of Chia Teck Leng in 2003
- Born: 11 October 1959; Singapore
- Occupations: Financial controller at Swire Pacific Offshore (former; c. 1994–1999); Financial manager at Asia Pacific Breweries (former; 1999–2003)
- Status: Incarcerated since 2 September 2003
- Criminal charges: 14 charges of forgery (convicted of six); 18 charges of cheating four foreign banks of about $117 million (convicted of eight); Four charges of criminal breach of trust involving $53 million; Two charges of money-laundering; Eight charges of abetment of passport forgery
- Penalty: A total of 42 years' imprisonment, consisting of seven consecutive jail terms of six years

Chia Teck Leng (谢德龙 Xìe Délóng; born 11 October 1959) is a convicted white-collar criminal from Singapore, who was known for his four-year commercial fraud which involved the swindling of $117 million from four foreign major banks to feed his gambling addiction during his time as a financial manager at Asia Pacific Breweries (APB). Chia's crime was known to be Singapore's worst commercial crime committed in the city-state, surpassing that of Teo Cheng Kiat, who embezzled $35 million from Singapore Airlines for 13 years while he was employed there before his capture and sentencing of 24 years' imprisonment in 2000.

Chia Teck Leng was arrested on 2 September 2003 when the Commercial Affairs Department (CAD) somehow got wind of his fraudulent activities, and he thus faced a possible life sentence when there were 46 fraud-related criminal charges brought against him. Although Chia managed to escape the maximum term of life imprisonment after pleading guilty to 14 proceeded charges in a brief trial, he was nevertheless sentenced to a lengthy 42-year term of imprisonment for his crime, which reportedly became the longest term of imprisonment ever meted out by the courts of Singapore for a commercial crime.

== Early life ==
Chia was born in Singapore on 11 October 1959. He completed his elementary and secondary school education. During his pre-university years, Chia studied at Victoria School. He graduated with a degree in accountancy from the National University of Singapore (NUS)

After his graduation from university, Chia Teck Leng began to work at the accounting firm Arthur Andersen. He went on to take several high-flying positions, including the vice president at UOB, and a financial controller at marine services company Swire Pacific Offshore. His latest job was a finance manager at Asia Pacific Breweries beginning from 20 January 1999, with an annual salary of between $200,000 and $300,000. During the period, Chia married a teacher. He had two sons born in 1987 and 1989 respectively.

According to his family, friends and colleagues, Chia was an unassuming but committed family man who was filial to his parents and a loving and caring father and husband, as well as a sociable and hard working man who owned a condominium at Serangoon Road. Unknown to them however, Chia was secretly leading a double life as a high-rolling hustler, and he secretly owned expensive cars, luxury apartments, and had a mistress half his age.

== Criminal career ==
=== Gambling addiction and commercial fraud ===
In 1994, while he was still employed at Swire Pacific Offshore, Chia Teck Leng began to gamble. Chia gradually became heavily addicted to gambling, which led to him suffering from huge debts during 1995 to 1996 and owed several banks about $100,000 in the form of overdrafts and credit card dues. It was only in 1997 when Chia went to visit Star Cruise ships almost every fortnight for gambling sessions, he began to rake in winnings that were worth fortunes, and he received a credit offer of $75,000. His winnings grew to about $1 million within less than a year.

However, in August 1998, Chia lost his winnings of $1 million from one gambling spree, and he suffered from new debts as a result of his losses. Chia’s debts were mounted sky-high when he joined Asia Pacific Breweries (APB) as its financial manager on 20 January 1999. Out of desperation to pay off the debts, Chia began to forge documents merely five days after he took up his new job. During his four-year forgery crime spree, Chia targeted four foreign banks - one Swedish bank Skandinaviska Enskilda Banken (SEB), two Japanese banks Sumitomo Mitsui Banking Corporation (SMBC) and the Mizuho Corporate Bank and one German bank Bayerische Hypo-und Vereinsbank Aktiengesellschaft (HVB) - and swindled a total of $117 million from them.

Using his fake documents, Chia was able to open bank accounts under APB’s name, and he designated himself as the sole signatory. Chia had a credit facility for $500,000 from SEB for his use, among the four banks he targeted. Chia was the sole controller of these accounts because he was able to forge the director board resolutions which gave him the authority to receive the credit and loan facilities, sign the transactions and manage the bank accounts on behalf of APB. Chia also successfully forged the signatures of the various directors of APB, after he practiced using the specimens of annual reports and internal documents as references to allow the signatures look authentic.

Chia’s modus operandi was to withdraw money from the three banks - SMBC, Mizuho and HVB - through the fake accounts he opened under APB’s name before he transferred them to the SEB bank accounts. Through the SEB account, Chia was able to stake out funds for gambling by transferring them to his two personal accounts with DBS before it was remitted to casinos in Australia, Britain, Hong Kong, Malaysia and the Philippines. Before his criminal ways were exposed, the banks deeply trusted Chia as a reliable and credit-worthy client, as he was able to make timely deposits to the accounts whenever repayments were due, for which the deposits came from the funds he swindled from any of the other banks. There was once in November 1999, when Chia withdrew $53 million from an APB account with OCBC, he was able to replace the entire amount by October 2002, thus narrowly escaping detection.

Aside from this, Chia’s gambling feats were increasing so that he was recognised by many casinos around the world. From July 2000 onwards, Chia would go to the Crown Casino in Melbourne through private chartered jets provided by the casino. He was given VIP treatment and was invited to stay in the casino’s most expensive room, which provided a butler service. At that time, it cost A$25,000 just to spend one night there. He was also a regular at London Ritz’s Club, where he could engage in higher-stake gambling. Originally coping with $200 bets during his sessions at Star Cruise casino, Chia went up to place single bets of between A$20,000 and 25,000 in British casinos. There was one occasion where he placed a single bet of A$400,000 at the Crown Casino.

=== Chia’s lavish lifestyle and mistress ===
In April 2002, aboard a casino cruise ship, Chia first met 22-year-old Chinese national Li Jin, who would later become his mistress.

Chia won $1 million from her that same night. Due to this, Chia began to request Li Jin as his opponent in gambling, considering her as his “good luck charm”, and he was also able to win every time he gambled against her. The resultant huge losses suffered by the casino prompted the casino to decide to give Li a day off whenever Chia arrived on board. Li, who graduated from Nanjing University, later resigned and she came to Singapore to begin a relationship with Chia, therefore becoming Chia's mistress.

As a result of his gambling feats, Chia spent lavishly on shopping, and his purchases included a $150,000 Mercedes-Benz and a $530,000 apartment in Grange Road. He also gave expensive gifts worth a total of $300,000 to various people, including his girlfriend. Chia even staked out $10,000 to procure a fake Taiwanese passport on behalf of Li, which made it easier for her to enter and leave Singapore. Under the alias Chu Chiao-Ling, Li travelled in and out of Singapore between November 2002 and January 2003 with the help of the fake passport.

== Arrest and investigations ==
On 2 September 2003, 43-year-old Chia Teck Leng was arrested at his home by the police, after the Commercial Affairs Department (CAD), through unknown means, were notified of and discovered Chia's criminal activities. Li Jin was also arrested and she spent six months in jail for using a forged passport.

Upon his arrest, Chia was charged two days later on 4 September 2003, of two counts, one of cheating and one of forgery involving $3 million, which he swindled from SEB in February 1999. As further investigations were conducted, the gradual revelation of the true magnitude of Chia's crimes resulted in more charges levelled against Chia. By 11 September 2003, he was facing eight new charges. He was accused of earlier cheating the four banks - SMBC, Mizuho, HVB and SEB - into giving him a total credit of about $113 million.

On 17 September 2003, the newfound details of Chia's crimes attracted 18 more charges relating to money withdrawals from the four banks, such as US$25 million from SEB, and US$10 million from SMBC. On 24 September 2003, Chia was charged with four more counts of forgery in relation to opening of bank accounts and transferring funds from APB’s OCBC bank account to a fictitious Citibank account. It was on 5 December 2003 when Chia, with finality, was slapped with 14 new criminal charges.

Altogether, Chia faced a total of 46 charges:

- 14 charges of forgery
- 18 charges of cheating
- four charges of criminal breach of trust
- two charges of money-laundering
- eight charges of abetment of forgery of a passport (related to Li Jin)

Among the charges faced by Chia, the most serious charge was forgery, which attracts the maximum penalty of life imprisonment or alternatively, up to ten years of imprisonment, along with a possible fine. Should Chia be found guilty, he would possibly be sentenced to life imprisonment.

From the beginning of investigations, Chia was fully cooperative with the police. He gave them every detail of what he had done during these four years. he not only answered their questions but also volunteered information on the other bank accounts, where most of the funds were held, and on the flow of the funds. He also helped in the tracing and the recovery of the money by signing all necessary papers. In total, over $34.8 million were recovered, while the remaining $82.3 million remained missing. Some thousands out of Li Jin’s confiscated money, which were $1.2 million in total, were also included in the funds recovered by the police. The police speculated that Chia lost an estimated amount of $62 million to gambling.

The foreign authorities also yielded some money amounting to $11 million and $230 million from both Chia Teck Leng's casino and bank accounts in Australia and Switzerland respectively.

== Trial and sentencing ==
=== Guilty plea and submissions ===
On 2 April 2004, Chia Teck Leng stood trial in the High Court of Singapore for the various financial crimes he committed. The sole prosecutor-in-charge, Thong Chee Kun, decided to proceed with 14 charges out of 46, with the remaining to be taken into consideration during sentencing. Chia, who was represented by defence lawyers Edmond Pereira and Benjamin Choo, was convicted on the same day after pleading guilty to six charges of forgery and eight charges of cheating. He also reportedly expressed his intention to plead guilty prior to his trial.

The prosecutor Thong Chee Kun, in his closing submissions on sentence, submitted a very strong case. Thong argued that the sentence for Chia should reflect the sentencing principles of retribution and deterrence as ruled by law. He described this case as “the largest case of commercial fraud in the history of Singapore”, where an unprecedented $117 million was cheated from the four banks, who provided the funds based on their interests of wanting to establish business relationships but unfortunately fell victim to Chia’s selfishness. The premeditation and planning behind Chia’s offences were also aggravating and they amounted to an abuse of the trust placed on him by his employers and banks, as well as damaging Singapore's reputation as an honest and efficient financial hub. Even if Chia was a first-offender and had pleaded guilty, the highly aggravating nature of his crimes and abundance of evidence had diminished the mitigating factors of his case, hence a long custodial sentence is necessary.

The defence lawyer Edmond Pereira submitted his mitigation plea to the courts, pleading for a lenient sentence. They raised the testimonies of people who knew Chia to substantiate his good character and his contribution to charity over the years leading up to his capture: even Chia’s two sons submitted a touching personal letter to the judge asking him to give their father a lenient sentence as they considered him a good, caring and loving father and husband. His full cooperation and voluntary admission of his offences and embezzled funds were other factors that should be taken into consideration as mitigating factors in his favour.

Pereira also said that Chia committed the offences due to his desperation to discharge his financial debts, and he did not do so to satisfy his greed and gambling addiction, and the banks should have been mindful in lending Chia money when they received the forged documents. The banks should also have adopted more stringent measures to avoid themselves being swindled and these were necessary to maintain Singapore’s reputation as an honest and efficient financial hub, rather than imposing a harsh sentence to deter like-minded offenders. Finally, Pereira also argued that life imprisonment is not necessary as Chia did not siphon off any money to secret accounts and therefore would not have any opportunity of enjoying the fruits of his illegal acts upon his release from prison.

=== Verdict ===
On the same day Chia was convicted, High Court judge Tay Yong Kwang was ready with his sentencing verdict. He decided to sentence Chia to a total of 42 years’ imprisonment, for which the sentence was to take effect from the date Chia was arrested (2 September 2003).

Justice Tay described in his judgement that Chia’s crime was the work of a “criminal genius”, noting how Chia had managed to deceive banks undetected over a period of four years. He stated that these foreign bankers were eager to forge business relationships, and not be the unwitting victims of forgery, thus dismissing Chia’s argument that the banks approached him first with money and had been too naive, trusting and negligent, making it easy for him to commit the crimes, which the judge described as casting blame on the victims. He also condemned Chia for using the funds for an expensive lifestyle for himself and to feed his gambling habits.

Justice Tay also stated that Chia’s actions have also caused damage to Singapore’s reputation as a transparent financial hub. These crimes had caused blows at the heart of banking and commerce, and may erode the open halls of trust and erect the high walls of suspicion. They lead to ever more stringent checks by banks on honest businesses with the attendant impact in terms of time and cost. Chia may not have kept any secret accounts elsewhere, but he had squandered enough money that could feed many people for life. Hence, Chia should face the harshest penalty possible for his crime. Despite his strongly-worded judgement, Justice Tay took note of the instances of Chia’s good character and the letter by Chia’s two sons, whom he regarded as good children who gave very moving accounts of their father. He also assured the boys that he was not punishing their father for gambling, and encouraged them to continue loving their father.

For the charges Chia was convicted of, Justice Tay Yong Kwang sentenced Chia to six years’ jail for each of the 14 charges. Seven of these six-year jail terms were ordered to run consecutively with effect from Chia’s date of arrest. In total, Chia was ordered to serve 42 years of imprisonment.

Chia initially expressed he would appeal against his sentence, but no outcome was reported, and his sentence was unchanged

== Imprisonment and writing ==
After his sentencing, Chia Teck Leng was escorted to Changi Prison to serve his 42-year sentence.

While he was still serving his sentence, in light of the government’s plans and debates to build integrated resorts (which have casinos), Chia penned down a 13-page essay titled "Taming The Casino Dragon", which recounted his gambling experience in casinos: how they operated; the risks involved, and his view on safeguards that should be put in place should the government decide to build a casino. The overall reception of Chia's published paper was mixed, as some felt that Chia was merely trying to deflect blame from his criminal conduct, while others found it insightful. Chia reportedly wrote it to reflect on his crimes and to remind others to not follow in his footsteps.

Chia Teck Leng is serving his 42-year sentence. Should he serve with good behaviour, he will be entitled to a one-third remission and be eligible for parole in 2031 after serving 28 years in prison, at which time he would be 72 years old.

== Aftermath ==
=== Subsequent lawsuits ===
In the aftermath of the case, the four banks - SMBC, Mizuho, HVB and SEB - then filed lawsuits against APB for the fraud committed by its employee Chia Teck Leng, and sought repayments for the losses they suffered from Chia's crimes. Mizuho later withdrew its suit, while the remaining three had their suits rejected. In rejecting the litigation suits of both SEB and HVB on the same day, Supreme Court judge Belinda Ang said in her verdict that the two banks made themselves easy preys by neglecting their own banking procedures and failing to take note of any discrepancies or inconsistencies in Chia's forged documents that were "staring bank officers in the face".

=== In the media ===
The serial financial crimes of Chia Teck Leng were considered a notable crime that shook Singapore. In July 2015, Singapore's national daily newspaper The Straits Times published a e-book titled Guilty As Charged: 25 Crimes That Have Shaken Singapore Since 1965, which included Chia's case as one of the top 25 crimes that shocked the nation since its independence in 1965. The book was borne out of collaboration between the Singapore Police Force and the newspaper itself. The e-book was edited by ST News Associate editor Abdul Hafiz bin Abdul Samad. The paperback edition of the book was published and first hit bookshelves in June 2017. The paperback edition first entered the ST bestseller list on 8 August 2017, a month after publication. While the list of cases in the book mostly consisted of murder cases (like the Adrian Lim murders and murder of Huang Na), Chia Teck Leng's case, as well as those of Nick Leeson and James Phang Wah were the three among Singapore’s most notorious financial crimes that made it in the list.

== See also ==
- List of major crimes in Singapore
- Nick Leeson
- James Phang Wah
