= Amoy Street wine shop murder =

1972 shooting and murder of a wineshop merchant in Singapore

- Chew Liew Tea, the 42-year-old wine shop proprietor who was shot and killed
- Date: 9 August 1972
- Location: Amoy Street, Singapore
- Outcome: Neoh arrested in Penang and charged in Singapore with murder in 1972; Lim arrested in Selangor and charged in Singapore with murder in 1973; Neoh and Lim found guilty of murder and sentenced to death in 1973; Neoh and Lim executed by hanging at Changi Prison in 1975
- Deaths: Chew Liew Tea (42)
- Injuries: None
- Convicted: Neoh Bean Chye; Lim Kim Huat
- Verdict: Guilty
- Convictions: Murder
- Sentence: Death penalty

On 9 August 1972, which falls on Singapore's National Day, 42-year-old Chew Liew Tea (周留的 Zhōu Líudì), who operated a wine shop at Amoy Street, was shot and killed by two Chinese Malaysians, Lim Kim Huat (林金发 Lín Jīnfā) and Neoh Bean Chye (梁民才 Liáng Míncaí), who both escaped Singapore and fled to their home state of Penang in Malaysia, before they were separately caught by the Malaysian police between September 1972 and February 1973, and extradited back to Singapore to be charged with Chew's killing.

During their trial, both Lim and Neoh gave defences that they never intended to kill Chew. Lim stated that he never knew the gun was loaded when he fired it at Chew and claimed it was an accidental shooting, while Neoh stated that the gun, which belonged to him, was never meant for killing or hurting anyone, but to threaten Chew during their robbery plot. However, after the prosecution proved that both defendants had the intention to kill Chew in furtherance of committing armed robbery, Neoh and Lim were found guilty of murder, and condemned to death on 8 November 1973. Nineteen months later, the two gunmen were hanged on 27 June 1975 following the dismissal of their appeals against the death penalty.

== Shooting at wine shop ==
During the early hours of 9 August 1972, which was also National Day of Singapore, at a wine shop located at Amoy Street, taxi driver Sim Ah Nam finished his drinks session with his friend Chew Liew Tea, who was the owner of the shop and who wanted to close his shop to go home. After Chew offered to invite him later on, Sim left the shop to urinate at the back lane. At the time he left the shop, Chew was last seen with two other male customers, who were drinking beer and Guinness stout. Just as Sim was walking back to the shop after he finished, he heard a gunshot.

Upon reaching the wine shop, Sim witnessed one of the two male customers holding a revolver above Chew, who was shot in the chest and unconscious on the floor. Sim quickly escaped and shouted out the word "robbery" to alert people nearby and seek help, before he returned to the shop, where he saw the two men escaping the shop on a motorcycle. A teenage noodle seller, who witnessed the escape of the gunmen, alerted Chew's wife, who lived a few doors away. Chew's wife and son rushed to the shop to tend to Chew, who was also helped by a 60-year-old man who was grinding chilli on a nearby street. Unfortunately, Chew did not survive his gunshot wound to the chest and died. He was 42 years old at the time of his death, and left behind a wife and six children. According to Professor Chao Tzee Cheng, a senior forensic pathologist who conducted an autopsy of the body, the bullet had penetrated Chew's right lung and heart, and led to Chew's death.

== Capture of the gunmen ==
The Singapore Police Force conducted their investigations into the death of Chew Liew Tea, which they classified as murder. A month after the police conducted their investigations, they received the assistance of the Royal Malaysia Police, and the Malaysian police managed to arrest one suspect named Neoh Bean Chye (also spelt Neo Bean Chye) at Penang. Neoh, a Chinese Malaysian bum-boat operator who was born in Penang and lived there, was extradited to Singapore and charged with murder on 27 September 1972. Later, the police recovered a gun and five bullets from a friend of Neoh's, which they identified as the probable murder weapon.

On 22 February 1973, the Singaporean police were informed that the second suspect and Neoh's accomplice, Lim Kim Huat, a Chinese Malaysian who also came from Penang, was caught by the Royal Malaysia Police in Selangor and turned over to the Singaporean authorities four days later. Lim, who worked as a construction labourer, was charged with murder the next day, and he was committed to stand trial together with Neoh for the killing of Chew.

== Trial and sentencing ==
=== Prosecution's case ===
Neoh Bean Chye, the owner of the gun, which was used to kill Chew.

Lim Kim Huat, who was identified by a witness as the one who shot and killed Chew.

On 30 October 1973, the High Court conducted the trial of both Lim Kim Huat and Neoh Bean Chye for the murder of Chew Liew Tea. Lim was represented by Michael Hwang while Neoh was represented by Amarjit Singh. Glenn Knight was the trial prosecutor, and the trial was presided over by two judges Choor Singh and D. C. D'Cotta (Dennis Cosmo D'Cotta). Professor Chao Tzee Cheng and Chew's friend Sim Ah Nam came to court as witnesses to testify for the prosecution.

A taxi driver, Lee Mong Koi (also spelt Lee Mong Qoi), who was a known friend to Neoh and Lim, also appeared as a key witness for the prosecution, and he testified that Lim and Neoh had mentioned killing Chew during a robbery when he met them at a coffee shop. He also claimed that Neoh passed to him a revolver and five bullets, wanting to sell them to him, but Lee did not have the money, so he asked to keep it until Neoh's return to Singapore from Penang. The gun, which Lee surrendered to the police after Neoh's arrest, was the same weapon which the men used to kill Chew. Lee also stated that he heard Lim saying that during the robbery, he held the victim Chew at gunpoint and told him in Penang Hokkien that he should not move or he would "splash" him. Under Lee's recount to the court, the term "splash" meant "shoot" in Hokkien. The defence counsel sought to cast doubt over Lee's evidence, claiming that Lee had bought the gun instead of safekeeping it for Neoh, and deliberately falsified his testimony in order to avoid being implicated for the offence of illegally possessing a firearm, which was punishable by imprisonment and caning.

It was established by the prosecution that both men had tried to rob Chew but failed to, which led to them killing Chew. It was also established through witness accounts and fingerprint tests that the gun belonged to Neoh, and that Lim was the one who fired the gun and killed Chew, and both of them were at the scene of crime. Although it was certain and clear-cut from the prosecution's case and evidence that Lim, who directly killed Chew, would face the death penalty for murder, there was a crucial question at trial on whether Neoh should be held as equally culpable as Lim for killing Chew despite not being the one who fired the gun.

=== Defence's case and closing submissions ===
Both men elected to give evidence under oath. Neoh admitted on the stand that the gun belonged to him and he had indeed loaded the gun, but he testified that there was never an intention to commit murder despite their plan to commit robbery. Neoh stated that after he and Lim travelled from Penang to Singapore to commit armed robbery, they brought along the gun, which would be used to threaten Chew if necessary. He recounted that after Chew put up a struggle against the two men at gunpoint, the revolver was discharged during the scuffle and Chew collapsed, and the firing of the revolver was not on purpose. Similarly, Lim testified on the stand that he never meant to shoot Chew during the fight between him and Chew, as the gun had somehow gone off without notice and wounded Chew on the chest, and the two men had to flee from the scene before they could be caught, leaving Chew to die at his shop.

In response, the prosecution submitted that Lim intentionally fired the gun to kill Chew, and the death of Chew was caused in furtherance of the duo's common intention to commit robbery and by application of the provisions under Section 34 of the Penal Code, Neoh should be held equally liable to a charge of murder as Lim, since he and Lim shared a common intention to commit robbery and murder, and they had planned to use the gun to facilitate their crime and use violence if necessary, and made plans to wait for the opportunity to commit armed robbery.

=== Verdict ===
On 8 November 1973, the trial judges Choor Singh and D. C. D'Cotta ruled in their verdict that both Neoh Bean Chye and Lim Kim Huat were accordingly convicted of the charge of murdering 42-year-old Chew Liew Tea, after they accepted the prosecution's arguments and rejected the men's defences of accidental shooting or having no intention to kill. Neoh and Lim were both automatically condemned to death upon their conviction for murder, as capital punishment was prescribed as the mandatory sentence for all four offences of murder under the Penal Code and judges in Singapore had no discretion (up until 2013) to impose any other punishments aside from death in these cases.

Neoh and Lim were reported as among the 17 inmates held on death row at Changi Prison pending their executions as of February 1974, for which the number decreased to 15 by October 1974 while they were appealing their sentences. Among these inmates (most of whom were convicted of murder) were the seven murderers of the Gold Bars triple murders, who were later executed for killing a businessman and two others for 120 gold bars.

== Appeal processes ==
In July 1974, both Neoh Bean Chye and Lim Kim Huat appealed to the Court of Appeal to review their cases, but the three judges - Chief Justice Wee Chong Jin, Tan Ah Tah and A V Winslow - upheld that the two men clearly had the common intention to cause Chew's death in the course of firearm robbery, and hence they dismissed the appeals on 5 August 1974.

On 9 April 1975, both Neoh and Lim applied for special leave to appeal to the Privy Council of London in a final bid to escape the gallows, but the Privy Council refused to approve their applications, which therefore finalized their death sentences.

== Executions and aftermath ==
On 27 June 1975, after losing their final death row appeals, both Neoh Bean Chye and Lim Kim Huat were hanged at Changi Prison. Both men's families, who received their death warrants one week before the executions, travelled from Penang to Singapore to collect their bodies. A Buddhist monk, who counselled both Neoh and Lim while they were still on death row, said prayers and authorized their funerals on their behalf after the double hanging of the gunmen.

In the aftermath of the men's executions, the trial prosecutor Glenn Knight would become famous for his 1983 prosecution of Adrian Lim, Singapore's most infamous child killer, who was hanged in 1988 for murdering two children for ritual sacrifice, and became director of the Commercial Affairs Department, but his reputation would be tarnished with his conviction for bribery in 1991. Knight, who was subsequently disqualified from practicing law for sixteen years after his 1991 trial and imprisonment for corruption, later wrote his memoir, in which he recorded the case of Chew Liew Tea's shooting as one of his most memorable cases. The book was published in 2012, the fifth year after his re-instatement and return to practice (which the court approved). Knight died in 2025 at the age of 80.

The case of Neoh Bean Chye and Lim Kim Huat was one of the early legal cases that touched on the applicability and relevance of Section 34 of the Penal Code in convicting a person of murder in lieu of the common intention shared by more than one member of the group charged for such an offence, and it was cited by several judgements where more than one person was charged and tried for murder by common intention, like the Bock Tuan Thong murder case and the Wan Cheon Kem robbery-murder case.

== See also ==
- Capital punishment in Singapore
