= Glenn Knight =

Singaporean lawyer (1944–2025)

- Knight in 2023
- Born: Glenn Jeyasingam Knight; 13 November 1944
- Died: 19 February 2025 (aged 80)
- Education: National University of Singapore
- Occupations: Lawyer; prosecutor
- Spouse: Pathmavali Rengayah

Glenn Jeyasingam Knight (13 November 1944 – 19 February 2025) was a Singaporean lawyer. He was the first Director of the Commercial Affairs Department (CAD) when it was founded in 1984. He lost his post in 1991 after being convicted of corruption in a much-publicised trial. In 1998, he was again tried and convicted for misappropriating money while in office. Knight was allowed to return to practice as a lawyer in 2007.

== Background ==
Knight was born on 13 November 1944, and was a student of Anglo-Chinese School. In the 1990s, he was the vice-chairman of its Old Boys' Association and a member of its board of governors. He obtained his bachelor of laws degree from the National University of Singapore in the 1960s, and played the guitar in a jazz band to raise money for his tuition fees.

He joined the Singapore Legal Service in 1970 and rose through the ranks "with the speed and power of an Exocet missile," as Queen's Counsel Roy Allaway later described it. Soon he acquired a reputation for being a law enforcer who prosecuted criminals without fear or favour. News of his ability and integrity impressed David Marshall, so much that when he retired he offered to give Knight a full partnership in his law firm; however, Knight was content to remain in the Legal Service and declined the offer.

Knight was married to Pathmavali Rengayah. The couple had no children.

== Notable cases ==
In 1978, Knight was the deputy public prosecutor in the trial of former magistrate Khoo Hin Hiong. In 1983, he acted for the Prosecution again in the trial of Adrian Lim, who had murdered two children. In 1985, he was the senior state counsel and deputy public prosecutor who filed an affidavit on behalf of the Attorney-General requesting that the High Court cite five defendants for contempt of court over an editorial published in the Asian Wall Street Journal (AWSJ) on 17 October 1985. Titled "Jeyaretnam's Challenge", the editorial had questioned the "integrity and impartiality" of Singapore's judicial system. The affidavit led to an apology from the editor of the AWSJ. In 1986, he was the public prosecutor for the Commercial Affairs Investigation Department who filed charges against key people in Pan Electric Industries ("Pan-El"), such as Tan Kok Liang, Tan Koon Swan, and Peter Tham, in the aftermath of the company's collapse. For his role in the Pan-El investigations, Knight was commended by then-Finance Minister Richard Hu in 1989. Knight also led the prosecution team in Singapore's first case of insider trading, that of former United Overseas Bank banker Allan Ng. On National Day 1990 (9 August 1990), he was awarded the Public Administration Medal, Gold, for his work as Director of the Commercial Affairs Department.

== First investigation and trial ==
On 23 March 1991, Knight was suddenly replaced as CAD director by Senior State Counsel Lawrence Ang in a decision that shocked the local legal community. It turned out that Knight was under investigation by the Corrupt Practices Investigation Bureau (CPIB). After an investigation lasting more than two months—one of the longest probes into the conduct of a public servant in Singapore—Knight was arrested on 27 May 1991 and charged with corruption the next day. He was the first Singapore legal officer to face such charges. Specifically, he was accused of cheating three businessmen into investing S$3,000,000 each into the former Batam Island Country Club on the Indonesian island of Batam, as well as giving false information to the CPIB regarding vehicle purchases, an application for a car loan, and his corporate investments. The judge originally set Knight's trial to commence in October 1992, but changed his mind and brought it forward to September 1991 after the prosecution complained that its witnesses had been subject to intimidation, and investigating officers had received mysterious phone calls warning them to "watch out". In July that year, his wife and two others were also arrested and charged over the Batam resort investments.

In a district court on 29 September 1991, Knight pleaded guilty to cheating then managing director of Trans-Island Bus Services Ng Ser Miang to try to make him invest in the Batam resort project, which had been planned by Knight and his wife. In October, he was sentenced to three months in prison.

Knight appealed against the sentence, and in March 1992 he managed to get his sentence reduced to a $17,000 fine and a day in prison. He served the jail sentence and paid the fine on the day it was announced. In deciding to reduce the sentence, High Court Judge L.P. Thean said that a "nominal custodial sentence" was sufficient given the mitigating circumstances in Knight's case. In April, all charges against his wife in relation to his case were also dropped.

=== Aftermath ===
Although the sentence meted to him was eventually reduced, the corruption case had left permanent damage on Knight's career as a civil servant. After investigations on him began in March 1991, he faced disciplinary hearings and his services were terminated on 26 March 1992. The President also revoked the prestigious Public Administration Medal, Gold, that had been awarded to Knight. In August 1994, the High Court struck Knight off the roll of advocates and solicitors, meaning that he could no longer practise law. After being disbarred, Knight worked as a consultant in a public-listed company.

== Second investigation and trial ==
In 1998, Knight was again charged in court—this time with criminal breach of trust by misappropriating money totalling $4,200 when still the CAD's Director on two occasions, in 1989 and 1990. This second charge caused Knight to resign from his job.

During the trial, the defence argued that the proceedings were invalid as Knight had been granted immunity by the Attorney-General's Chambers in 1991 from further charges arising from his corruption investigations, in exchange for him to plead guilty in the earlier trial. They argued that the latest set of charges stemmed from that investigation and thus were subject to the immunity clause. The CPIB revealed that it had been tipped off about the misappropriation of money only in 1997 by an unnamed informant. The court ruled that the proceedings could continue because the 1991 probe into Knight's dealings did not investigate his misappropriation of money. Eventually the court found him guilty of two charges of misappropriation and sentenced him to a $10,000 fine and another day in jail.

== Later life and reinstatement of legal practice ==
The second conviction left Knight even worse off than before. The company he was working for before his second trial refused to re-employ him. Jobless, he engaged himself in community work in his church, Covenant Community Methodist Church, and often visited a pub in Boat Quay of which his wife was a partner. He faded quietly from public life.

On 25 April 2007, he re-appeared in the news when he filed an application seeking court approval to be reinstated as a lawyer. His application was granted on 22 May 2007, making him only the sixth lawyer to be reinstated in the Law Society of Singapore's 35-year history. He later joined the law firm Bernard & Rada Law Corporation.

One of Knight's cases in court after his reinstatement was the Stirling Road murder of 2007. Knight, together with three other lawyers, represented odd-job worker Tharema Vejayan Govindasamy, who was charged with murdering his ex-wife Smaelmeeral Abdul Aziz by flinging her off the 13th floor of a HDB block in Stirling Road, Queenstown. Knight and the rest of the counsel argued that Tharema should not face the gallows for murder on the account of a delusional disorder that made Tharema believe he was under the influence of black magic that caused his marriage to end with a divorce and his relationship with Smaelmeeral to break down. Subsequently, the trial court rejected the defence's contention and therefore found Tharema guilty of murder, and sentenced him to death in May 2009.

In 2012, Knight penned his memoir, titled The Prosecutor: Glenn Knight, which recorded his life, legal career, as well as his downfall and later return to legal practice. Several of his well-known cases, including the Adrian Lim murders, the Chew Liew Tea shooting case and the Tan Koon Swan trial, were recorded on his book. Knight also accepted an interview in 2017, agreeing to speak about his past illustrious career as a star prosecutor and his fall from grace, as well as the humility and acceptance of his actions.

== Death ==
Knight died at the age of 80 on 19 February 2025. He was reported to have died while boarding a flight back to Singapore from Australia (where he was visiting relatives). Knight's wife had died a few years before him, and he had no children.
