= Tay Yong Kwang =

Singaporean judge

The Honourable Tay Yong Kwang
- 郑永光 / 鄭永光

Judge of Appeal of the Supreme Court of Singapore
- In office 1 August 2016 – 2 September 2026
- Appointed by: Tony Tan

Judge of the Supreme Court of Singapore
- In office 2 January 2003 – 1 August 2016
- Appointed by: S.R. Nathan

Judicial Commissioner of Singapore
- In office 15 October 1997 – 2 January 2003
- Appointed by: Ong Teng Cheong

Personal details
- Born: 3 September 1956 (age 70)

Tay Yong Kwang
- Traditional Chinese: 鄭永光
- Simplified Chinese: 郑永光
Transcriptions
Standard Mandarin
- Hanyu Pinyin: Zhèng Yǒng Guāng

Tay Yong Kwang is a Singaporean former judge of the Supreme Court. He was first appointed Judicial Commissioner in 1997, appointed Judge in 2003, and appointed Judge of Appeal in 2016. He was noted for being the presiding judge in several notable cases (especially murder) that shocked the nation and made headlines in Singapore. He was most recently re-appointed for a further two-year term on the Court of Appeal from 3 September 2024. He retired in 2 September 2026.

== Notable cases ==
=== Public Prosecutor v Zhou Jian Guang and Another ===
In April 2000, as Judicial Commissioner, Tay became the presiding judge of the kidnapping trial of Zhou Jianguang and Shi Songjing, two Chinese illegal immigrants who were involved in the kidnapping a 14-year-old girl for ransom. Zhou, Shi and the mastermind Vincent Lee Chuan Leong committed the crime on 9 September 1999 when they abducted the teenager while she was on her way home at Bukit Timah, and she was confined for three days before her father paid a ransom of $330,000, allowing her to be released sixty hours after her abduction. All three kidnappers were arrested within a few days after the girl's release.

Tay, in his judgement, found that the death penalty was inappropriate given that the kidnappers did not harm the girl and treated her well during her confinement, save for the trauma she suffered and the verbal threat they made on her safety and life. He decided to sentence both Zhou and Shi to life imprisonment and did not impose caning on the two Chinese men, having noted that the mastermind Lee also did not receive caning when he himself was similarly sentenced to life in prison by another judge in a separate trial session.

=== SIA embezzlement scandal ===
Between 9 February 1987 to 18 January 2000, over a period of 13 years, Singapore Airlines cabin crew supervisor Teo Cheng Kiat misappropriated an approximate sum of S$35 million from his company. Teo joined Singapore Airlines as a clerk in May 1975 and was promoted to cabin crew supervisor in 1988. It was his job at that time to oversee the allowance payments to the cabin crew. Teo siphoned money off the payments and transferred them to his bank accounts while doctoring records of the cabin members on the flights, using names of those who did not fly on the various flights to conceal his criminal activities. He also manipulated his wife and younger sister to allow him to gain control of their bank accounts and transfer the money he embezzled to their bank accounts. It was due to an internal audit error that led to the arrest of a 47-year-old Teo on 19 January 2000. On 30 June 2000, Tay found Teo guilty of ten charges of criminal breach of trust and sentenced him to 24 years in prison.

=== The criminal case of Anthony Ler ===
On 14 May 2001, 34-year-old Anthony Ler Wee Teang hired a 15-year-old youth to assassinate his wife, 30-year-old Annie Leong Wai Mun, who was in the midst of divorcing him, so that he can become the sole owner of their flat and himself gain custody of their then-4-year-old daughter. On 5 December 2001, Tay, who presided the case, found Ler guilty and sentenced him to death for masterminding the murder while sentencing the unnamed boy to indefinite detention at the President's Pleasure because he was underage and cannot be hanged. In his verdict, Tay stated that he did not believe Ler's plea of innocence and pointed out the evidence proving Ler's motive to commit the crime, stating Ler's act of crying at his wife's funeral were nothing more than "rehearsed acts performed by an accomplished actor" and called the boy's story "truthful"; he also said that the boy was not a cold-blooded killer, but was a teenager who was manipulated by an adult experienced in the ways of the world and adult machinations. Ler was hanged in December 2002 while the boy went on to spend 17 years in prison before his release in November 2018 when President Halimah Yacob granted clemency for him and remitted the remaining part of his sentence.

=== Murder of football player Sulaiman bin Hashim ===
On 31 May 2001, 17-year-old footballer Sulaiman bin Hashim, together with his two friends, were attacked by a 8-member Malay Salakau gang at South Bridge Road. Sulaiman was killed in the gangfight, with two fatal knife wounds out of the thirteen he suffered being the cause of his death, while his other two friends managed to flee and call the police. One of the gang members, 22-year-old Muhamad Hasik bin Sahar, stood trial before Tay in the High Court on 9 May 2002.

Before the incident, Hasik was previously convicted of causing hurt with dangerous weapons, and sentenced to reformative training at the age of 16 in 1996. When delivering his verdict in May 2002, and having made reference to Hasik's criminal records, Tay felt that Hasik has not "learnt his lesson" even after his previous experience in court, and now that he has committed a crime of greater violence and an innocent life has been lost as a result, the then-judicial commissioner sentenced Hasik to life imprisonment and 16 strokes of the cane after pleading guilty to a reduced charge of culpable homicide not amounting to murder (or manslaughter), and backdated the sentence to the date of Hasik's arrest in June 2001. In his words, Tay reiterated in his judgement:

Those who feel victorious in being vicious and who have no qualms about the annual celebration of one's birth culminating in the untimely death of another will have to spend all subsequent birthdays within prison walls until such time as they are eligible for parole.

Later, in August 2002, Hasik's appeal for a lighter sentence was rejected by the Court of Appeal.

=== Trial of Peh Thian Hui ===
On 24 May 2002, Tay presided the trial of Peh Thian Hui, a 48-year-old housing agent charged with raping the daughter of his lover, who had consented to these sexual assaults and also participated in the obsence acts personally. Peh was said to have raped the girl for 54 times, starting from 1996 to 2000. The girl, who turned 15 in 2001, reported the matter to the police, leading to the arrests of Peh and her mother on 8 November 2001. Peh pleaded guilty to ten out of 62 charges while the mother pleaded guilty to seven out of sixty charges in the same trial hearing.

In his written grounds of decision on sentence, Tay harshly criticised the couple for the aggravated rape of the girl, who was not named to protect her identity. He cited that the mother had failed in her duty by allowing her boyfriend to commit the rapes on her own child, and it defied all notions of motherhood for her to be a bystander and abettor of the sexual abuse her daughter went through. Tay also admonished Peh for preying on a child in order to satisfy his perverse sexual interests with "revolting regularity", and he stated that for the sake of retribution and deterrence, Peh should be separated from both the victim and society as long as possible.

Tay therefore sentenced Peh and his co-accused to 36 years in prison each, and also added 24 strokes of the cane to Peh's sentence; the mother was not caned since she was a female. The couple's appeal against their sentences were dismissed in September 2002.

=== The case of Chia Teck Leng ===
In April 2004, Tay, now as a High Court judge having promoted the year before, would sentence 44-year-old Chia Teck Leng, a compulsive gambler and finance manager from Asia Pacific Breweries (APB), to a total of 42 years' imprisonment for Singapore's then biggest case of commercial fraud after convicting him of 14 out of 46 charges of criminal breach of trust, citing that the $117 million he swindled out of four foreign banks was "enough to feed many people for life".

=== Chua Ser Lien and Tan Ping Koon ===
In September 2004, Tay presided over the trial of two businessmen, Chua Ser Lien and Tan Ping Koon, both charged with kidnapping a seven-year-old girl for ransom on 25 December 2003. Chua and Tan were facing financial difficulties in their work, and committed the crime to get money to repay their debts. However, they were caught red-handed, and released the girl at another street minutes after the abduction, but they blackmailed the family to give them a ransom on the threat of harming the family. Eventually, the police managed to arrest both Chua and Tan after they received the ransom.

Both Tan and Chua pleaded guilty to the kidnapping charges, and Tay, having considered their psychiatric conditions and noting that both men never harmed the girl, decided not to sentence the two men to death and thus sentenced them to life imprisonment plus three strokes of the cane each instead. Chua would eventually commit suicide in July 2020 while still in prison, 17 years after the crime.

=== Kallang River Body Parts Murder ===
Another case was 50-year-old Leong Siew Chor, who strangled his 22-year-old lover Liu Hong Mei to death and cut up her body into seven pieces before disposing them at the Kallang River. Leong's alleged motive was that he wanted to avoid Liu from discovering that he had stolen her ATM card and stolen all her savings of more than $2,000 and report him, which might risk expose his secret love affair to his wife and three children and other people known to him. Tay sentenced Leong to death in 2006 after founding him guilty of murder as he rejected Leong's defence that Liu willingly allowed him to strangle her as a way of a lover's suicide pact. He stated that Liu, who was young and intending to pursue a polytechnic diploma in tourism, excited to attend her sister's wedding etc., would not have any reason to commit suicide. In his judgement, Tay stated that “In the classic tragic tale of ill-fated love, the luckless lover committed suicide. Here, Romeo killed Juliet. It was a most disgusting and despicable murder. Liu Hong Mei died a very cruel, heartbreaking death.” Leong was subsequently hanged on 30 November 2007, after the failure of his appeal and clemency plea to the Court of Appeal and President of Singapore respectively.

=== "One-eyed Dragon" Tan Chor Jin ===
On 15 February 2006, with the help of his driver accomplice and childhood friend Lim Choon Chwee, 39-year-old gunman Tan Chor Jin, alias Tony Kia, forcefully entered the Serangoon flat of 41-year-old nightclub owner Lim Hock Soon and pointed a gun at Lim and his family, threatening them and intending to rob them, as well as to settle scores with Lim on some unsettled issues. After robbing the family of their valuables, and telling Lim to tie up his wife, maid and then-13-year-old daughter, Tan told Lim to go into his study while the others gone to other rooms. Tan then proceed to fire his gun at Lim six times (one of the shots missed), and Lim, who sustained five gunshot wounds on his back, left arm, left thigh, right cheek and right temple, died as a result of the fatal gunshot wound at his right temple.

Tan, who managed to escape Singapore with the help of Malaysian Ho Yueh Keong, was arrested in Kuala Lumpur ten days later, after he was listed on the Interpol wanted list in light of the shooting. Initially charged with murder, Tan was subsequently brought to trial in the High Court on an amended charge of unlawfully discharging a firearm under the Arms Offences Act, which also warrants the mandatory death penalty like murder. Tan did not find a lawyer to represent himself in his defence, and defended himself in the trial, becoming the first man in more than 16 years to conduct his own defence when facing the death penalty in Singapore. Despite putting up a defence that he was drunk and he fired the gun accidentally and did it in self-defence when Lim tried to use a chair to attack him (which is not possible since Lim's hands was also tied up at that time before his death), Tay found him guilty rejected his defence, calling his actions were of “assured and accomplished assassin”, his story of accidental shooting a laughable fantasy, since it required strength to pull the trigger, and sentenced him to death.

Tan later engaged veteran lawyer Subhas Anandan to represent him in his appeal, and the appeal was met with failure subsequently in January 2008. On 9 January 2009, Tan was hanged after losing a clemency from the President. Ho Yueh Keong, who went on the run for 9 years before his arrest in Kuala Lumpur in July 2015, would later sent to jail for 20 months for helping Tan escape Singapore, and Lim Choon Chwee was also imprisoned for 6 months for failing to report a robbery after receiving a discharge not amounting to an acquittal for abetment of murder.

=== Lee Chez Kee ===
In September 2006, Tay presided the trial of Lee Chez Kee, who was charged with the robbery and murder of Lee Kok Cheong, a NUS English professor, back on 12 December 1993. Lee was one of the three perpetrators involved in the crime, and he was on the run for 13 years before being discovered inside a Malaysian prison serving a prison term for vehicular theft. By the time Lee was extradited back to Singapore for trial, his two accomplices were already dealt in court in 1998 for their respective roles; one of them, Ng Chek Siong, was sentenced to jail for eight years with ten strokes of the cane on robbery charges, while the second robber, Too Yin Cheong, was found guilty of murdering the professor and was hanged in April 1999.

During the trial, Tay determined that Lee had strangled the victim with the view of silencing him and avoid leaving him alive as a potential witness to report the robbery to the police, therefore he should be convicted of murder and sentenced to hang on 11 October 2006. Tay's decision to sentence Lee to hang for the crime was later upheld by the Court of Appeal through a majority decision of 2 to 1 in May 2008, and Lee was eventually hanged on 2009.

=== Murder of Wan Cheon Kem ===
In 2007, Tay heard the case of three robbers charged with murdering a lorry driver Wan Cheon Kem during a robbery heist on 30 May 2006. One of the killers, Nakamuthu Balakrishnan, used a baseball bat to hit Wan on the head multiple times, causing Wan to die from head injuries six days after the brutal assault. Tay determined that Balakrishnan had intentionally inflicting the fatal injuries on Wan during the robbery, and thus his actions were equivalent to an offence of murder under Section 300(c) of the Penal Code. He further found that Balakrishnan's two co-accused, Christopher Samson Anpalagan and Daniel Vijay Katherasan, shared the common intention to rob Wan and the fatal assault caused by Balakrishnan was in furtherance of the common intention to rob Wan, and hence both Christopher and Daniel were also found guilty of murder by common intention, leading him to sentenced the three men to death on 19 March 2008.

The robbers then appealed, and in September 2010, the Court of Appeal found that Tay had erred in finding both Christopher and Daniel guilty of murder since they never had the knowledge that Balakrishnan would assault Wan to his death or having the intention to carry out the fatal assault, hence they cannot be considered guilty based on the common intention of murdering Wan. Hence, both Christopher and Daniel were instead convicted of robbery with hurt and had their death sentences set aside. On the other hand, the Court of Appeal agreed with the decision of Tay to convict Balakrishnan of murder, since Balakrishnan had committed murder by intentionally inflicting the fatal injuries on Wan during the robbery, and therefore, Balakrishnan became the sole attacker to face the gallows in July 2011.

Subsequently, the cases of Daniel and Christopher were remitted to the High Court and Tay re-sentence the duo to 15 years' imprisonment and 15 strokes of the cane each on 4 October 2010, after considering the brutality of the attack and their respective roles in the robbery.

=== Dave Teo Ming ===
On 2 September 2007, 20-year-old National Serviceman Dave Teo Ming sparked a 20-hour-long nationwide manhunt when he went AWOL, with a SAR-21 assault rifle, eight rounds of ammunition and a knife. The purpose of Teo's AWOL was due to him wanting to kill Crystal Liew, Teo's girlfriend who broke up with him in April that same year, as well as five others whom Teo hated in his life. After his arrest, Teo faced multiple charges under the Arms Offences Act. Teo's fellow serviceman, Ong Boon Jun, who was in company of Teo who was possessing a rifle, was charged under the Act as well. At Teo's trial, it was revealed that Teo had an unhappy childhood and had experienced several tragedies in his life. These events caused Teo to encounter disciplinary problems and also led to him suffering from depression, according to an IMH report. Teo had finally snapped after his girlfriend dumped him, which drove him to commit the crime.

On 9 July 2008, Teo pleaded guilty in the High Court and Tay sentenced him to 9 years and 2 months' imprisonment and 18 strokes of the cane. During sentencing, Tay expressed his sympathy towards Teo for his unfortunate circumstances, advising him to turn over a new leaf while in prison. In his words, he said to Teo:

'My heart hurts for you that so young a man will have to spend some of the best years of his life in prison and have to undergo so many strokes of the cane, but I trust that you understand a deterrent sentence is unavoidable in the circumstances.

Dave (Teo), you have had a very hard life. I hope that this unfortunate and traumatic wrong turn in your life will make you much more mature and a whole lot wiser and that you will spend the next few years reconstructing your young life.

I hope that you will pursue your studies, listen to good advice from counsellors and learn many skills while in prison and that, upon your release, you will have a life full of meaning and purpose to honour the memory of your grandmother and your beloved younger brother.

It has been written, 'To everything there is a season'. There was a time when you loved, there came a time when you hated. There was a time when you felt you wanted to kill, now is the time for you to heal. There was a time you were broken down, now is the time to build yourself up. There was a time when you were at war in your being, now is the time to restore peace within.'

As for Ong Boon Jun, he was sentenced to 6 years and 6 months' imprisonment and 6 strokes of the cane for being in company with a person in an unlawful possession of a firearm; Ong later lost his appeal for a lighter sentence.

=== Bala Kuppusamy ===
On 3 March 2009, Tay made legal history when he sentenced 48-year-old cleaner, Bala Kuppusamy, to 42 years of imprisonment and 24 strokes of the cane, which was then the longest jail term ever meted out for a sexual crime within Singapore's jurisdiction. In sentencing, Tay admonished Bala as a "merciless, marauding monster" who preyed on seven women for purpose of robbery and even sexually assaulted three or four of them, taking place just a few weeks after he was released from prison for similar offences (Bala was convicted of rape and robbery twice in 1987 and 1993 respectively). Labelling Bala as a menace to society and "not fit to live freely in society" due to his propensity to violence against females—even after serving a total of 22 years and 8 months imprisonment and receiving 52 cane strokes—and referring his prior antecedents, Tay agreed with the prosecution to impose a lengthy sentence on Bala for the sake of retribution, deterrence and the protection of society. He also dismissed Bala's promise to be repentant as "extremely hollow" in view of the aggravating nature of his crimes.

=== Downtown East slashing ===
Tay heard the case relating to the death of 19-year-old Republic Polytechnic student Darren Ng Wei Jie in a gang-related murder that occurred on 30 October 2010 in Downtown East, where 12 members of a rival gang attacked Ng and slashed him with knives and choppers and screwdrivers, which led to Darren suffering from a total of 28 knife wounds on his head, neck, chest and limbs, one of which was fatal and caused Darren to bleed to death. Seven people were convicted of rioting while the other five people, including the mastermind Stilwell Ong Keat Pin, were charged with murder and stood trial before Tay in 2012.

At the trial in July 2012, the murder charges were reduced to culpable homicide and Tay convicted the five people accordingly. Tay reserved the sentencing until 8 September, and during the sentencing, the judge reportedly said that it was as heartbreaking for the court as it must have been for the parents watching the proceedings. He said in court as he passed the sentences on the five youths, "I can only implore especially on behalf of all parents, young persons in secret societies and street gangs to open their eyes to the tragic truth that violence begets violence and vicious acts only breed more vicious reactions." In the end, the five gang members were sentenced to lengthy jail terms ranging from 8 to 12 years and to caning between 10 and 12 strokes of the cane, with the mastermind Stilwell Ong receiving the most severe sentence among the five.

=== The re-trial of Kho Jabing ===
On 17 February 2008, two Malaysians from Sarawak, Kho Jabing and Galing Anak Kujat, robbed two Chinese construction workers in Geylang, and one of them, 40-year-old Cao Ruyin was severely bludgeoned on the head by Kho Jabing, then aged 24; Cao died from his severe head and brain injuries six days later in a coma. Kho and Galing were tried for murder, and were both condemned to hang in 2010 by the High Court for robbery and murder. Following an appeal in 2011, Galing's conviction was reduced to robbery with hurt and his death sentence was commuted, while Kho failed to escape the gallows when his appeal was rejected. However, the execution was postponed due to the Singaporean government deciding to review the mandatory death penalty laws for murder (and capital drug trafficking).

After Parliament removed the mandatory death penalty, offered an alternative sentence of life imprisonment with/without caning for murder with no intention to kill, and a chance for all death row inmates to reduce their sentences in January 2013, Kho applied to the Court of Appeal to have a chance to reduce his death sentence. In May 2013, the Court of Appeal approved Kho's application and sent his case back to the High Court for re-sentencing, and a re-trial was conducted soon after. Although it was ruled that for Kho's re-sentencing the original trial judge should review the case, High Court judge Kan Ting Chiu, the original trial judge, was retired since 2011 and so Tay took over as the presiding judge for Kho's re-trial.

At the re-trial, as he was not the original trial judge for Kho's murder trial, Tay referenced Justice Kan's written verdict, as well as that of the Court of Appeal in order to reach his decision in this case. On 14 August 2013, after taken into consideration Kho's young age at the time of the offence, his choice and use of "opportunistic and improvisational" weapon during the robbery, and an unclear sequence of events on that night as noted by the Court of Appeal, Tay overturned Kho's death sentence and sentenced him to life in prison and 24 strokes of the cane instead, making Kho escaping the gallows as well.

However, the prosecution, who earlier sought the death penalty at the re-trial, appealed against Tay's decision on the basis of the brutal nature of the crime to the Court of Appeal, and in January 2015, Kho was once again re-sentenced to death, with three of the five judges felt that the crime was vicious and was committed with a blatant disregard for human life, which made it more appropriate to impose a death sentence rather than life. On 20 May 2016, more than 8 years after Cao Ruyin's murder, 32-year-old Kho Jabing was hanged in the gallows after a final reunion and farewell with his family.

=== Kovan Double Murders ===
Tay presided over the trial of the Kovan Double Murders, which a police officer, Senior Staff Sergeant Iskandar bin Rahmat, murdered father and son, Tan Boon Sin and Tan Chee Heong, at Kovan on 10 October 2013

On 4 December 2015, Tay sentenced Iskandar to death after founding him guilty of the double murder charges. He rejected Iskandar's claims of self-defence and that the killings was a result of a robbery gone wrong, because the injuries on the victims were inflicted on vital parts of the body and the force used were too excessive for self-defence etc., which clearly shown that Iskandar has intended to cause death and silence the victims upon the discovery of his monstrous acts. Tan Boon Sin suffered from a completely degenerated cartilage at his right knee, which made him having difficulty to walk or getting up from a sitting position. This also shown that, as what the prosecution argued, the elder victim could not have possibly be able to charge at Iskandar. Also even though he was 4 cm taller than the 173-cm-tall Iskandar, Tan Chee Heong was around 30 kg lighter than Iskandar, so the younger victim was not really physically threatening to him.

After losing his appeal in 2017 and clemency plea in 2019, Iskandar was eventually hanged on 5 February 2025.
