= Sunshine Empire =

Defunct multi-level marketing company

- Founded: 2003
- Founder: James Phang Wah
- Headquarters: Singapore

Sunshine Empire was a Multi Level Marketing (MLM) company, set up in 2003, based in Singapore, founded by James Phang Wah. It is now defunct, with assets frozen by the Singapore Court. The company is listed by the Singapore Government's Monetary Authority in its Investor's Alert List, possibly for running investment schemes without authority. After investigation by the Commercial Affairs Department (CAD) of the Singapore Police and a court trial, Sunshine Empire's Directors were charged with and found guilty of fraud, criminal breach of trust and falsifying accounts.

The company had gathered up to S$189 million in funds through investment schemes, alleged to have never materialised and to have been in fact, part of a Ponzi scheme. The initial trial revealed that over S$115 million were paid out as 'investment returns', while another S$40 million were transferred to associates as 'interest free loans'. The remaining amount is believed to have been expended or paid out to directors as fees.

== History ==
Before setting up Sunshine Empire, Wah had started multi-level marketing firm Number One Product, which sold magnetic mattresses. Sunshine Empire was set up in 2003 as part of the Empire Group Alliance.

== Management ==
It was reported that there were separate groups within the company; a group of middle-aged people who were trained separately from the majority, and managers who drove luxury sedans like Mercedes-Benzes and BMWs with some being only in their early twenties, and other members. The managers were always dressed in black suits and carried Montblanc pens and wallets. The managers would also take other members out for supper after the training sessions because they said it would foster bonding and that it was an opportunity for other members to see the cars they drove.

== Closure ==
=== Events leading to investigations ===
The fact that Sunshine Empire's merchants could notch up what seemed like profits without ever buying or selling products meant that its business model resembled a pure financial investment scheme or Ponzi scheme.

There have been allegations that the Sunshine Empire was a Pyramid scheme, with victims in East Asian Countries.

Sunshine Empire was placed on the Monetary Authority of Singapore's (MAS) investor alert list and Malaysia's Securities Commission alert list.

On 8 October 2008, the Consumers Association of Singapore's executive director, Seah Seng Choon, cautioned participants against transferring their money to Hong Kong, as it would put their investment outside Singapore's jurisdiction.

On 24 October 2008, it was reported that James Phang Wah did not own Sunshine Empire but was just a charismatic adviser to Sunshine.

=== Investigation and charges ===
On 3 February 2009, investigation by the CAD was concluded after one year, two months and three weeks. It was found that Sunshine Empire had generated a revenue of $189 million in just over a year.

Jackie Hoo Choon Cheat, a director of Sunshine Empire, and James Phang Wah each faced a charge of fraudulent trading under Section 340 of the Companies Act; a charge of failure to maintain proper accounting records of Sunshine Empire under Section 199 of the Companies Act; and eight charges of criminal breach of trust as an agent of Sunshine Empire under Section 409 of the Penal Code.

Phang also faced six charges of falsification of Sunshine Empire's accounts under Section 477A of the Penal Code and one charge of false declaration of the share capital of Empire Communications Technology Pte Ltd under Section 401 (2A) (b) of the Companies Act. In addition to the Penal Code and Companies Act charges, Phang faced three charges of possession of uncensored and obscene films under the Films Act.

Neo Kuon Huay, a director of Empire Emall (S) Pte Ltd and wife of Phang, faced six charges of falsification of Sunshine Empire's accounts under Section 477A of the Penal Code and one charge of false declaration of the share capital of Empire Emall (S) Pte Ltd under Section 401 (2A) (b) of the Companies Act.

Mr. Yong Wai Hong, director of Empire Communications Technology Pte Ltd, Bingo Group Holding and various companies, faced six charges of false declaration of the share capital of various companies under Section 401 (2A) (b) of the Companies Act.

Subhas Anandan represented all four as they claimed trial. Neo, Hoo and Yong were offered $600k bail each and their passport impounded.

Three of the accused, apart from Yong, were arrested on the afternoon of 2 February 2009 and spent the night in remand. Yong was on police bail then. They were subsequently released on bail and were driven away in a convoy of Mercedes-Benzes and BMWs.

=== Trial and sentence ===
The trial began at the Subordinate Court on 29 March 2010. On 16 July 2010, Phang and Hoo were found guilty of perpetuating fraud, of criminal breach of trust and for falsifying accounts.

On 30 July 2010, Phang was sentenced to nine years' jail and fined $60,000; his wife, Neo Kuon Huay, found guilty of falsifying payment vouchers, was fined $60,000; former company director, Hoo was sentenced to seven years' jail.

== See also ==
- Ponzi scheme
- Pyramid scheme
- Money Laundering
