= Peh Thian Hui case =

2002 court case of a man charged with raping his lover's daughter for four years

Peh Thian Hui
- 2001 police mugshot of Peh Thian Hui
- Born: Peh Thian Hui; 1953 (age 72–73); Colony of Singapore
- Occupation: Housing agent (former)
- Spouse: Unnamed wife
- Children: 3
- Status: Incarcerated since 8 November 2001
- Convictions: Rape (five counts); Carnal intercourse (one count); Molestation (two counts); Abetment of molestation (one count); Using criminal force (one count)
- Criminal charges: Rape (54 counts); Carnal intercourse (two counts); Molestation (three counts); Abetment of molestation (two counts); Using criminal force (one count)
- Penalty: 36 years' imprisonment and 24 strokes of the cane

Between 1996 and 2000, over a period of four years, a young girl was raped by her mother's boyfriend Peh Thian Hui (白添辉 Bái Tiānhuī), a married father of three. Peh had committed the sexual assaults at least fifty times throughout the four-year period before he stopped in December 2000. The sexual offences were eventually reported to the police by the victim, who was 15 years old as of November 2001, leading to the arrest of Peh and her mother, the latter who had abetted Peh to rape her daughter.

To protect her identity, neither the victim herself nor her mother had their names released publicly. Aside from this, Peh and his accomplice faced at least sixty charges each for multiple sexual offences committed against the girl, and they were convicted as charged after pleading guilty to some of the charges (ten for Peh and seven for the mother).

In May 2002, Judicial Commissioner Tay Yong Kwang of the High Court sentenced both Peh and the mother to 36 years' imprisonment each, with Peh additionally receiving 24 strokes of the cane for these sexual crimes, which shocked the nation at that time when it first came to light. Subsequently, the couple appealed against their 36-year sentences, but in September 2002, their appeals were rejected by Chief Justice Yong Pung How (and two other judges) of the Court of Appeal.

== Background and case ==
Peh Thian Hui, a Singaporean citizen and housing agent married with three children (one son and two daughters), first met his girlfriend in 1988 through the introduction of his childhood friend, who was the husband of the woman. Peh agreed to hire the woman to work under him, and their workplace was at the Tampines flat of Peh's childhood friend. At that time, Peh's childhood friend and his wife had three children - two sons and one daughter. As they worked together, Peh and his friend's wife grew closer to one another, and aside from this, the woman was gradually drifting apart from her husband, who began to stay away from the flat from 1990 onwards, and only returned on public holidays or weekends. These factors led to Peh and the woman having an affair in 1991, and Peh would regularly help take care of the woman's three children.

One day in September 1996, Peh requested to his lover that he wanted to touch her daughter's groin. The woman agreed to do so out of love for her boyfriend and out of fear of losing her boyfriend. It was during that same month, Peh began to sexually abuse his lover's daughter, who was nine years of age at the time she first encountered the abuse. The child at first resisted the man's advances before her mother scolded her and forced her to submit to Peh's advances, claiming that every female liked going through the process of sex. Throughout the next four years, Peh regularly raped the child whenever he came to the girl's home (except for weekends and public holidays), and he had done so for about 54 times. In each of these occasions, the girl's mother acted as a bystander and for two out of these occasions (one in 1998 and another in either 1999 or 2000), the mother also personally participated in the sexual assault by touching her daughter's private parts while Peh was simultaneously having sex with the mother-daughter pair. As a result of these multiple acts of sexual abuse, the girl suffered from mycoplasma infection, which was a sexually transmitted infection. She also deliberately went home later than usual to avoid coming face-to-face with Peh.

Some instances of the abuse were given in detail according to court documents related to the case: one of them took place on the night of 31 December 1999, when Peh (who was staying over his lover's flat at that time) raped the girl inside the bedroom as usual, while the television was having a live broadcast of the countdown to the year 2000. As he was watching the programme, Peh reportedly waited until the stroke of midnight before he continued to have sexual intercourse with the girl, wanting to do the act on the first day of the year 2000; the girl's mother remained outside the room knowing that the act was taking place. On another occasion, Peh used a vibrator to perform a sexual act on the victim sometime in 1999. A third instance of the sexual assault happened at Pasir Ris Park sometime in 2000, when Peh parked his van at the park itself and raped the girl inside the rear cabin of his van, with the girl's mother acting as a lookout outside the van. It was also mentioned in court that Peh would perform oral sex on the girl on some occasions and even asked the victim to do it with him.

Eventually, in December 2000, Peh stopped raping the girl, and Peh no longer visited the flat since March 2001, after the girl's father returned to live with his wife and children, although his affair with the girl's mother remained the same, up till the day he was arrested for his crimes.

== 2001 investigation and arrest ==
In October 2001, the teenage victim found out that her mother was filing for divorce and planned to seek custody of all her three children, including the victim herself. The victim did not wish to stay with her mother any longer and she finally told a laptop store owner and his wife - whom she befriended the year before - about the sexual abuse she gone through.

On 5 November 2001, after much persuasion from the couple, the victim, accompanied by the laptop store owner, went to a police station to file a report against Peh and her mother. At the time she made the police report, the girl had just turned 15 a few days before. Three days after she reported the matter to the police, Peh, who was then 48 years old, was arrested at his matrimonial home, while the girl's 35-year-old mother was also apprehended for abetting Peh to rape her daughter.

After their arrests, Peh and his lover were both charged in court. Peh faced a total of 62 charges, including 54 counts of rape and eight other counts related to oral sex and molestation, while the female co-accused faced a total of sixty charges, most of which were related to abetting Peh to rape her daughter and the others included the possession of pornographic material and molesting her daughter.

== Trial ==
=== Plea of guilt and submissions ===
On 24 May 2002, both Peh Thian Hui and his girlfriend stood trial at the High Court for the charges of raping the latter's daughter. Both accused pleaded guilty to the charges against them; Peh pleaded guilty to ten out of 62 charges (five of these charges were for rape) while the mother admitted to seven out of sixty charges (five for abetment of rape), and the remaining ones were to be taken into consideration during sentencing.

When the incident first came to light through the media coverage of the trial, it sparked a huge public outcry and many Singaporeans were shocked and angered to hear that a mother had helped her boyfriend to rape her own daughter, and even forced her daughter to undergo such a traumatizing ordeal, and most of them (including readers who telephoned the press) condemned the couple for their heinous acts. It was one of the court cases that made headlines in Singapore back then in the year 2002. The victim and her mother were not publicly named to protect the identity of the victim.

The prosecution, consisting of Ravneet Kaur and Francis Ng, argued that the sexual crimes committed by Peh and his co-accused were particularly atrocious and inhumane, and they cited the trauma of the victim and her age when she was raped by Peh, and the number of such sexual abuses that occurred in this case to support their notion for a harsh and deterrent punishment. Not only that, the prosecution submitted that the female defendant's betrayal of her child's trust, her failure to uphold her maternal duty of protecting the victim and her role of instigating and abetting the rapes should also be taken into consideration, as these factors made the victim's mother equally culpable for the horrific ordeal she subjected her daughter with and that her punishment should be as severe as that of Peh for the case.

The couple's lawyers pleaded for leniency when they presented a mitigation plea to the trial court. Peh's lawyer Kertar Singh submitted that Peh was a first-time offender and he was regretful of his actions. Singh also stated that when he was around eight to ten years old, Peh had an unusual sexual encounter with a slightly older girl who performed oral sex on him and told Peh to perform oral sex on her, which led to him becoming obsessed with having sex with young girls without pubic hair. As for the victim's mother, defence lawyer Peter Yap argued on her behalf that during her childhood, the mother was a victim of abuse and neglect, and she was unloved before and after her marriage at age 15 (the same age she had her first child). The lawyer also mentioned that his client was a victim of molestation in her childhood, and that she was deeply regretful for her actions towards her daughter, and also cited that the lack of criminal records in the mother's case should also be taken into account as one of the extenuating circumstances in her case.

=== Sentencing ===
On the same date of the couple's conviction, the trial judge, Judicial Commissioner Tay Yong Kwang, delivered his verdict on sentence.

In his written grounds of decision, Judicial Commissioner Tay described the case as a "very deplorably depressing" one, and he harshly admonished the couple in court for their respective conduct towards the victim, whose pitiful plight invoked an "overpowering sense of sadness" to anyone paying attention to the case. Starting with the victim's mother, Judicial Commissioner Tay stated that she was an "anti-thesis of a mother" and it defied the notion of motherhood when the female defendant forced her daughter to submit herself to her lover and even participated as both a bystander and abettor of the sexual acts, so much so that the judge found it as an incomprehensible atrocity committed by the mother and he said it was nearly "abominable" to consider the woman as the victim's mother, because she disregarded her parental duty of protecting her daughter and instead forced the girl to be raped by Peh, in the name of love for Peh. Describing the role of the victim's mother as a bystander, the judge said that the mother "was not merely standing by and making music while the city burns – she fed the flames".

Turning to Peh, Judicial Commissioner Tay pointed out that Peh was no "simple-minded debutant" when he began to satisfy his dark desires by constantly preying on a defenceless nine-year-old girl who had yet to reach puberty, and he did so with "revolting regularity" in the girl's home, which was supposed to be her sanctuary. Stating that Peh's crimes were not a one-off crime of passion, the judge concluded that based on the various aggravating factors of the case and his sexual obsession with female genitalia, it was convincingly clear that Peh's perversion "must never be allowed to touch and affect" another young girl's life, and that he should also be isolated from society for as long as possible under the law, including the life of the victim in the long run. The judge also did not put much weight in the claims of alleged childhood trauma raised by the defendants, stating that these were not the excuses for their crimes.

As such, for the most serious charges of aggravated rape, Judicial Commissioner Tay sentenced Peh to three consecutive sentences of twelve years' imprisonment, which in total amounted to 36 years of imprisonment, and he also imposed the maximum of 24 strokes of the cane for Peh, who was 48 years old at the time of sentencing, and caning is legally permissible for male offenders under the age of 50 in Singapore. As for the victim's 35-year-old mother, she was similarly sentenced to three consecutive jail terms of twelve years for the abetment of aggravated rape charges, leading to a total of 36 years' jail. The victim's mother was spared the cane since she was female. The jail terms of the couple were backdated to 8 November 2001, the date of their arrests. The mother reportedly broke down as the sentence was passed in court. Peh even reportedly asked the court interpreter if he would be publicly identified by the media.

At that time in May 2002, the couple's sentence of 36 years in prison were known to be one of the harshest penalties ever meted out for convicted sex offenders in Singapore. It was also reported that despite having reported her mother and the trauma she underwent, the victim still loved her mother and showed concern about what would happen to her mother. Psychiatric experts were also consulted by the press to speak about the trauma of child sexual abuse victims in light of the case. Peh's 83-year-old father told a newspaper that he was unaware of the crimes committed by his son at the time of Peh's arrest, which brought shock and surprise to him.

A week after the sentencing of the couple, the police publicly released the photo of Peh Thian Hui and his particulars, after the judge overruled the prosecution's request to withhold Peh's particulars and reasoned that Peh himself was not related to the girl, and hence there was no need to withhold his personal information from the public.

== Aftermath ==
=== Appeal ===
In June 2002, Peh Thian Hui and his former girlfriend each filed an appeal against their respective sentences of 36 years, as well as Peh's caning of 24 strokes.

On 9 September 2002, the Court of Appeal dismissed the appeals of Peh and the victim's mother. Chief Justice Yong Pung How, who was one of the judges hearing the appeal, expressed his disgust towards the victim's mother for her conduct, and described her as "the most despicable female (Yong) ever come across" for the past 50 years of his life on the Bar. He also stated that the couple deserved to be sentenced to life imprisonment for the crime, although the laws of Singapore did not include a life sentence as a penalty for rape.

Currently, the couple are still in prison serving their sentences since November 2001, with the possibility of parole for good behaviour in November 2025 after serving at least two-thirds of their sentences (equivalent to 24 years).

=== In popular media ===
On 28 October 2003, a year after Peh and his accomplice were convicted, Singaporean crime show True Files re-enacted the Peh Thian Hui case and aired it on-screen as the tenth episode of the show's second season. Similarly, the victim and her mother were given aliases to protect the former's identity. When she was interviewed in the show regarding the trauma of child rape cases, Dr Parvathy Pathy, a psychiatrist, stated that in cases of child sexual abuse, many victims felt ashamed of what happened, and it was made worse by the social stigma which many harboured towards the victims of these cases. Dr Pathy stated that the victims should understand that their shame was unwarranted because the rapist(s) should be the one harbouring those feelings of shame, and the victims should be treated with empathy, because they would suffer from trauma and some of their behaviours like throwing tantrums and depression were reactions to their trauma, and that people should understand and support these individuals.

== See also ==
- Caning in Singapore
- List of major crimes in Singapore
