= Allan Ng =

Singaporean businessman

- Born: 1941 (age 84–85); Singapore, Straits Settlements, British Empire
- Other name: Ng Poh Meng
- Occupation: Businessman
- Years active: 1967–2000
- Organization(s): United Overseas Bank (1967–1985); First City Holdings Group Limited (1986–1002)

Allan Ng Poh Meng (born 1941 in Singapore), is the Chairman of Newmark Capital whose principal business activities include investments in real estate, private equity, hedge funds and stakes in pre-IPO companies and public-listed companies in Hong Kong and China.

== Early career ==
Allan Ng was the Deputy Chairman of United Overseas Bank ("UOB"), one of the 'Big 3' local banks in Singapore for five years. He resigned in December 1985 after 18 years of service with UOB to pursue other business interests.

In 1985, Allan Ng served as the Chairman of the Singapore Association of Banks, a member of the Board of Trustees of the Institute of Southeast Asian Studies, and a member of the Crime Prevention Council in Singapore.

Also in 1985, he was appointed a member of the Singapore Government Economic Committee, headed by the then Minister of Trade and Industry, Mr. Lee Hsien Loong, and was also Chairman of the Banking and Finance Sub-Committee.

In 1986, Allan Ng teamed up with Tan Sri Khoo Teck Puat, a former banker and hotelier, to acquire a 29.9% interest in EXCO International, a UK financial services group, and a 13.5% interest in Standard Chartered Bank Plc ("StanChart"). He was appointed a director and Chairman of the Executive Committee of EXCO International and an alternate director of Standard Chartered Bank. This Standard Chartered stake was subsequently sold to Singapore's Temasek Holdings in 2004 following Tan Sri Khoo's death.

Also in 1986, he was Chairman of First City Holdings Group Limited ("First City"), a 50/50 joint venture between Allan Ng and Tan Sri Khoo, which acquired a 23% interest in Sealion Hotels Limited ("Sealion"), owner of the Grand Hyatt Hotel in Singapore. First City's wholly owned subsidiary, First City Investment Pte Ltd ("FCI"), accepted an offer to acquire an additional 1 million shares in Sealion at 60 cents per share from Tsang & Ong Stockbrokers when the shares of Sealion were still suspended. This additional purchase of 1 million shares by FCI was publicly announced and disclosed to the Stock Exchange of Singapore.

== Insider trading ==
In 1988, Allan Ng was charged with insider trading for causing FCI on 8 October 1986 to purchase 1 million shares in Sealion, (later renamed as First Capital Corporation Limited) while having prior knowledge that Sealion had requested the Stock Exchange of Singapore to lift the suspension of trading of its shares. Allan Ng pleaded guilty following a trial in 1989 that lasted 77 days and many days of cross-examination by Glenn Knight, the Deputy Public Prosecutor, making it the longest trial in Singapore at that time. In May 1989, Singapore abolished the right to appeal to the UK Privy Council except for criminal cases involving the death penalty or in civil cases where the parties had agreed to such a right of appeal.

On 16 September 1989, he was convicted and sentenced to 12 months’ imprisonment by the district court judge for violating the Securities Industry Act. The imprisonment term was suspended pending appeal.

In 1991, he was successful in his appeal to the High Court, which set aside the sentence of imprisonment and instead imposed a fine of S$50,000. The High Court Judge, M. Karthigesu, accepted Allan Ng's counsel, Mr Michael Sherrard QC's submission that a custodial sentence was inappropriate, unnecessary and excessive because of the very unusual circumstances of this case. Judge Karthigesu also accepted the submission that this case was "very unlike the more usual case of insider dealing where dishonest financial plunder was the object". He highlighted that there was no evidence that Allan Ng or FCI were out to make a "killing" as there was "no attempt made by Allan Ng to sell the 1 million shares in the first week after the lifting of suspension when the price went up to about 77 cents".

== Emigration and later career ==
In 1992, Allan Ng and his family emigrated to Vancouver, Canada following their successful application for permanent residence. The Canadian Immigration and the Justice Ministry held that the conviction in Singapore did not render Allan Ng an "inadmissible person" under the Canadian Immigration Act and hence granted him and his family permanent residence status.

In early 1994, Mr. Robert Kuok, Chairman of the Kerry Group (a conglomerate which owned the Shangri-La hotels, properties, media, and palm oil plantations, etc.) invited Allan Ng to join the Kerry Group. He was appointed Chairman of Kerry Properties, a major public listed company in Hong Kong, and also Vice-Chairman of Kerry Holdings Limited.

In 1999, he left the Kerry Group to start his own investment firm, Newmark Capital Corporation Limited ("Newmark Capital"). Newmark Capital's investments included an 11% stake in CyberCity Holdings ("CyberCity"), which developed the Shenzhen CyberCity Business Park as well as a business park in Beijing (a joint venture with Tsinghua University) in 2000. Newmark Capital was the second largest shareholder in CyberCity after Dr. Simon Jiang, founder and largest shareholder. Other substantial shareholders in CyberCity included Singapore's Temasek Holdings, Ascendas Pte Ltd (a wholly owned subsidiary of Singapore's Jurong Town Corporation) and Fraser & Neave Ltd ("F&N"). Newmark Capital and Dr. Simon Jiang's stakes in CyberCity were subsequently acquired by Ascendas Pte Ltd, which together with F&N, now control CyberCity through Fraser Property (China) Limited.
