= James Phang Wah =

Singaporean criminal

- Born: Singapore
- Education: National University of Singapore
- Occupation: Founder of Sunshine Empire Criminal
- Organization: Sunshine Empire
- Spouse: Neo Kuon Huay
- Status: Released on 20 December 2017 (Singapore)
- Conviction: July 2010
- Criminal charges: Eight (8) charges of Criminal Breach of Trust §409, six (6) charges of falsification of accounts §477A, and one (1) charge of fraudulent trading §340(5), Singapore; two (2) charges of accepting deposits without licence §25(1) and §106(1) of the Banking and Financial Institution Act 1989, Malaysia
- Penalty: 9 years' imprisonment, and $60,000 fine (Singapore)
- Accomplices: Jackie Hoo Choon Cheat and Neo Kuon Huay

James Phang Wah is a convicted criminal and former businessman. Before his arrest and conviction, he was the founder, director and international president of the now-defunct Empire Group Alliance.

== Early life and education ==
Phang grew up at a vegetable farm in Lim Chu Kang, Singapore. Phang left school after his O levels and worked at a shipyard. He would study at night after work for his A levels and entered National University of Singapore (NUS). He graduated from NUS in 1983 with a degree in economics and statistics.

== Career ==
Since Phang was 19, he started doing door-to-door sales selling various products..

After graduation, Phang worked at Shin Min Daily News for six years from 1984 to 1990 as a feature writer. He left Shin Min and started multi-level marketing firm Number One Product in 1990, which sold magnetic mattresses.

In 2003, Phang set up Empire Group Alliance which had a complex network of different businesses which included Sunshine Empire of which he was the advisor. Sunshine Empire pursued investors into investing various business projects which are effective Ponzi schemes.

== Commercial Affairs Department investigation ==
Phang was investigated by Commercial Affairs Department in November 2007, two months after the Monetary Authority of Singapore placed Sunshine Empire on the investor alert list.

On 2 February 2009, Phang, his wife and Hoo were arrested and were remanded overnight. They were subsequently released on bail of $600,000 each and their passports impounded. They were driven away in a convoy of Mercedes-Benzes and BMWs. He was addressed as 'Lao Da' ('chief' in Mandarin) as he got into his car.

On 3 February 2009, Phang, with three others including Jackie Hoo Choon Cheat, a director of Sunshine Empire were charged with fraudulent trading, failure to maintain proper accounting records of Sunshine Empire and criminal breach of trust as an agent of Sunshine Empire.

Phang faced six charges of falsification of Sunshine Empire’s accounts and one charge of false declaration of the share capital of Empire Communications Technology Pte Ltd. He also faced three charges for possession of uncensored and obscene films at his Westwood Avenue home.

His wife, Neo Kuon Huay, a director of Empire Emall (S) Pte Ltd faced six charges of falsification of Sunshine Empire’s accounts under Section 477A of the Penal Code and one charge of false declaration of the share capital of Empire Emall (S) Pte Ltd.

Phang, with three others, claimed trial with Subhas Anandan representing all four.

On 16 July 2010, Phang and Hoo were found guilty of perpetuating fraud and criminal breach of trust. Phang and his wife were also found guilty of falsifying accounts. On 30 July 2010, Phang has been sentenced to nine years' jail and fined $60,000 while his wife was also fined $60,000.

A total of nearly S$190 million was swindled from the participants, of which only S$21 million was recovered by the Singapore authorities.

== Release and criminal charges in Malaysia ==
Phang was released on 20 December 2017. However, a day after his release, he faced charges of fraud which he committed in Malaysia. He was currently on trial for the crimes he committed in Malaysia. He was charged on 22 December 2017, for two counts of accepting deposits without a valid licence at Sunshine Empire's two premises in Kuala Lumpur, between 14 July 2006 and 17 October 2006, as well as between 18 October 2006 and 4 April 2008.

== Controversial claims ==
During media interviews, Phang described himself as a legend and 'better than Warren Buffett'. However, his name has never appeared on the List of Singaporeans by net worth, which lists all the billionaires and in Singapore. It is also not known whether James Phang Wah has met Warren Buffett.

In addition, Phang also claimed to have over one million students worldwide and to control more than US$300 million (S$439 million) in assets. Before his arrest and conviction, Phang emphasised that he 'would not harm anyone and my businesses are legal'. He also claimed that in his seminars, his loyal participants would also shout "Father, I love you!".

== Personal life ==
Phang is married to Neo Kuon Huay. He has four children.
