= Commercial Affairs Department =

Staff department of the Singapore Police Force

Coordinates: 1°16′42.29″N 103°50′21.57″E

- Abbreviation: CAD

Jurisdictional structure
- National agency: Singapore
- Operations jurisdiction: Singapore
- Governing body: Government of Singapore
- General nature: Civilian police

Operational structure
- Elected officers responsible: K. Shanmugam, Coordinating Minister for National Security & Minister for Home Affairs; Edwin Tong, 2nd Minister for Home Affairs; Muhammad Faishal Ibrahim, Senior Minister of State for Home Affairs; Sim Ann, Senior Minister of State for Home Affairs; Goh Pei Ming, Minister of State for Home Affairs
- Agency executives: David Chew Siong Tai, Director Commercial Affairs; Peggy Pao, Director Commercial Affairs (Designate); SAC Justin Wong Xing Shun, Deputy Director (Financial Investigation Group); Rachel Koo, Deputy Director (Enforcement Group); Ian Wong Kwok Onn, Deputy Director (Intelligence & Administration Group)
- Parent agency: Ministry of Home Affairs

The Commercial Affairs Department (CAD) is a staff department of the Singapore Police Force (SPF). The department was first established in 1984 as the Commercial Crime Department (CCD), it is the white-collar crimes unit of the SPF.

== History ==
The department was first established in 1984 as the Commercial Crime Department (CCD) with Glenn Knight as its first director.

== Modern day ==
=== Background ===
As the white-collar crimes unit of the police force, CAD conducts a variety of inquiries ranging from corporate irregularities such as LionGold and Data Register in 2014, as well as casino-related offences. It also has the right making arrests.

=== Probes ===
High-profile probes conducted by CAD include City Harvest Church founder Kong Hee, former bank relationship manager Vyia Lee Yock Sim who had misappropriated more than US$400,000 from seven high net-worth clients by 2006, China tourist guide Yang Yin with a widow's niece over a legal tussle assets believed to be worth $40 million.

In September 2003, the CAD is also responsible for the capture of Chia Teck Leng, who was found to have misused his position as the finance manager of Asia Pacific Breweries to swindle over $117 million from four foreign banks to pay off his debts and feed his gambling addiction. Chia is currently serving a 42-year jail term since 2004 for the crime, which was then the worst commercial crime Singapore has ever witnessed.

In January 2000, the CAD acted upon a report to arrest SIA cabin crew supervisor Teo Cheng Kiat for embezzling an approximate sum of $35 million from his company. Teo was charged with 26 counts of criminal breach of trust and corruption, and he was sentenced to 24 years in jail after the courts convicted him of ten out of these charges.
