= Sheng Siong kidnapping =

2014 case of an elderly woman kidnapped in Singapore

- Lee Sze Yong, the mastermind of the kidnapping. He was given a life sentence and three strokes of the cane in 2016
- Location: Hougang, Singapore
- Date: 8–9 January 2014
- Attack type: Kidnapping for ransom
- Perpetrators: Heng Chen Boon; Lee Sze Yong
- Motive: To discharge debts
- Convictions: Heng: Abetment of wrongful abduction; Lee: Kidnapping for ransom

On 8 January 2014, 79-year-old Ng Lye Poh (Chinese: 黄来宝; Pe̍h-ōe-jī: N̂g Lâi-pó), the mother of the Sheng Siong supermarket chain's founder CEO, was kidnapped by two men for a S$20 million ransom (later reduced to S$2 million after some negotiations). The next day, shortly after the ransom was paid and Ng's release, the two kidnappers – Heng Chen Boon (Chinese: 王振文; Pe̍h-ūe-jī: Hêng Tsíng-bûng) and Lee Sze Yong (Chinese: 李士荣) – were arrested and charged with kidnapping for ransom, an offence that carries the death penalty in Singapore, where kidnapping was considered an extremely rare crime. Eventually, one of the perpetrators, Heng, was jailed for three years on a reduced charge of abetting wrongful abduction, while Lee, who was the mastermind of the case, was found guilty of kidnapping for ransom and sentenced to life imprisonment and three strokes of the cane on 1 December 2016.

== Kidnapping of Ng Lye Poh ==
=== Background of the kidnappers ===
Lee Sze Yong, born in Singapore in 1972, worked as a salesman at a supermarket as of 2014. Lee, an only son of his family, first met his lover Heng Chen Boon (born in 1964) in the 1980s and before 2005, both men lived together with Lee's mother at Hougang for about ten years. Lee and Heng had once started a cleaning company in 1999 before it was terminated in 2001, and Lee went on to establish a computer software company for six years from 2006 to 2012. Heng, who worked as a credit card promoter, was declared bankrupt in 2005 and he spent eight years to discharge all his debts in August 2013.

=== Planning of kidnap plot ===
By 2010, Lee chalked up a debt of S$200,000, as a result of Lee's need to pay for his father's medical expenses and his huge spending on food and drinks, as well as buying a Volkswagen car and making two trips to Bangkok and Hong Kong. As for Lee's father, he suffered a stroke and was sent to a private nursing home which cost roughly S$1,500 per month, and Lee, whose monthly income was S$2,000, had to handle the medical fees, and it also put a huge strain on his finances. This led him to borrow money from banks, friends, and loan sharks.

As a result, after he chanced upon a Forbes List in 2010, Lee decided to kidnap a rich person for ransom in order to provide himself with sufficient money to discharge his debts and a lavish living lifestyle. Lee even planned to purchase property and expensive cars like a Ferrari California with the ransom. Aside from this, Lee also wanted to commit the crime to provide his mother and lover a better life.

For this kidnap plot (which Lee had planned for at least three years), Lee had accumulated a huge list of rich people (both Singaporeans and foreigners) he wanted to kidnap, and notably, the list includes:

- BreadTalk Group chairman George Quek
- “Popiah King” Sam Goi, a food chain owner
- Fragrance Group chairman Koh Wee Meng
- Kiat Lim, the son of Singaporean billionaire Peter Lim
- Indian businessman and singer Shael Oswal
- Property magnate Asok Kumar Hiranandani
- Indonesian tycoon Anthoni Salim
- Genting Group chairman Lim Kok Thay
- Singaporean business owner Goh Bak Heng

As part of his plan to kidnap any possible targets, Lee gathered business information on his potential targets and out of these targets, he would secretly watch their movements and organized stake-outs at some of their homes. Lee had once followed George Quek when he went out for his daily morning exercise at Singapore Botanic Gardens. Aside from this, Lee also researched on the cars drove by his potential targets and the schools their children attended. Lee also procured tools to carry out his kidnap plot.

Eventually, Lee selected Lim Hock Chee (Chinese: 林福星; Pe̍h-ōe-jī: Lîm Hok-chhiⁿ), an affluent businessman and founder CEO of local supermarket chain Sheng Siong, and planned to kidnap Lim's elderly mother to extort ransom from Lim. Lim, who was born in 1961, was the fifth of nine children and he grew up in Jurong, and his father was a fisherman who later turned to raising pigs at Lim Chu Kang for a living. Lim later dropped out of secondary school during his third year and he enrolled in a vocational institute. Lim became a pig farmer after completing his mandatory national service and he started a stall selling pork in 1984, which gradually grew into a store, and it would become a successful supermarket chain titled Sheng Siong, which was headed by Lim, and two of his brothers were the main stockholders of the board. Lim, who married his neighbour Lee Moi Hong and had four children (three sons and one daughter), was known to be a thrifty and hardworking man with a "big heart" despite his wealth, and he treated his employees well. In 2013, Lim was worth around S$500 million, and this information led to Lee targeting Lim's mother and finally carried out the plan on 8 January 2014.

=== Abduction of Ng ===
On the morning of 8 January 2014, Lim's mother, 79-year-old Ng Lye Poh, together with her domestic helper, had gone to Hougang for grocery shopping as she usually did for the past ten years. She was reportedly last seen heading to a coffee shop for breakfast after she passed the groceries to her helper, who parted ways with Ng and headed home.

At around 11.30am, 41-year-old Lee Sze Yong, who decided to execute the abduction plot on that same day, drove a rented Honda car and approached Ng, who was then alone walking home after breakfast. Lee came out of his vehicle and he lied to Ng that her son Lim Hock Chee had a bad fall and was severely injured. Ng, who was worried about her son, agreed to Lee's offer to bring her to see her son. After Ng entered his car, Lee drove to Seletar Camp where he stopped and slipped into the back seat to blindfold her from behind. Ng, who realized that she had been kidnapped, pleaded for mercy.

Using a Malaysian SIM card, Lee called Ng's 53-year-old son Lim Hock Chee, and informed him that he had kidnapped his mother. Lee demanded Lim to pay him S$20 million in exchange for his mother's release, and he threatened Lim to not report the matter to the police or he would kill Ng. Lim, who initially thought it was a kidnap scam call, eventually realized that his mother had actually been kidnapped after calling her maid and asking about her whereabouts, and also contacted his mother to no avail. Lim and his siblings later called the police in spite of Lee's threats, and as Ng was known to be humble and friendly despite her son's wealth, her abduction brought shock to her neighbors and friends. Similarly, when the kidnapping made the news, the staff members of Sheng Siong were also shocked in spite of their lack of knowledge about Lim's family.

Meanwhile, Lee enlisted the help of his partner Heng Chen Boon, who thought that Lee was a private investigator aside from his job as a supermarket worker. Heng, who met up with Lee at a car park in Punggol upon the latter's request, spotted Ng in a blindfold and Lee lied to Heng that this was a part of his private investigation. Heng helped Lee return the rented car while Lee transferred Ng to his own Volkswagen car, and he drove to several different locations in Singapore. By the time of nightfall, Lim contacted Lee at 7.30pm, and while he was accompanied by police officers monitoring the situation, Lim followed the police's instructions and told Lee that he was unable to raise the $20 million and after some negotiations, Lee agreed to bring the amount down to $2 million. The reduction was partly because Lee was not willing to drag the matter further and he also found out through Ng that she was diabetic and she needed to have her insulin injection.

Later that night, Heng met up with Lee at Sembawang Park after the latter called him. It was at that point, Heng finally learned the truth that Lee kidnapped Ng. Heng broke down at the truth and he tearfully pleaded with Lee to let Ng go, as kidnapping was a serious crime, but Lee refused to, and he also threatened to expose their past sexual relationship to Heng's mother should Heng refuse to help him. Heng relented and helped guard Ng inside the car, while Lee contacted Lim at 11pm and told him to bring a bag containing the ransom money to Sembawang Park, and drop the bag under a tree. After Lee confirmed that Lim had done so, Heng was told to take a taxi home, while Lee remained alone with Ng, after he retrieved the bag and placed it in another location in the park.

At 12.20am on 9 January 2014, Lee brought Ng to a bus stop nearby Seletar Camp, and informed Lim that he had dropped Ng off at the bus stop. Lim went to pick up his mother, who was unharmed and later taken to Khoo Teck Puat Hospital for a checkup. By then, the police managed to identify Lee and Heng through simultaneous investigations, and both men were arrested shortly after. Lim told a newspaper two days later that his mother was trying to move on and he was grateful for the support and well-wishes for his mother, and his family would also be helping Ng to move on. Residents and those working in Ng's neighborhood at Hougang were also relieved that Ng was safe, and many knew her as a kind and friendly woman.

== Arrest and charges ==
On 9 January 2014, the same date when Lee Sze Yong and Heng Chen Boon released their hostage, both men were arrested at least 40 minutes after they did so. Heng was arrested at his flat in Hougang while Lee was arrested at a friend's flat in Ang Mo Kio, and the ransom was later recovered.

On 10 January 2014, a day after their capture, both Heng Chen Boon and Lee Sze Yong, aged 50 and 41 respectively, were officially charged with kidnapping for ransom, an offence that attracts either a death sentence or a life term (in addition to possible caning). After he was charged, on 20 January 2014, Lee was led by police to Sembawang Park, where he was told to point out locations related to the crime. Four days later, both men were ordered by a district court to undergo psychiatric evaluation while in remand, and a month later, a psychiatric report deemed Lee mentally fit to make a plea in court.

The kidnapping of Ng Lye Poh was Singapore's first kidnap-for-ransom case in more than a decade. Before this, the last case of kidnapping happened 13 years before during Christmas Day of 2003, when a seven-year-old girl was taken from her home at Yio Chu Kang. The two perpetrators, Tan Ping Koon and Chua Ser Lien, were both arrested and sentenced to life in prison with caning (three strokes for each man); 17 years later, 58-year-old Chua died from suicide in prison in July 2020, while Tan is still incarcerated.

== Trial of Heng Chen Boon ==
On 9 April 2015, the kidnapping charge against one of the perpetrators, 51-year-old Heng Chen Boon, was reduced to abetment of wrongful abduction and confinement, which warranted the maximum jail term of ten years if found guilty, plus a fine or caning. At the same time, it was confirmed that Lee would be tried by the High Court on a later date for the original charge of kidnapping for ransom. Heng reportedly expressed his intention to plead guilty to the reduced charge.

On 11 May 2015, Heng pleaded guilty to the reduced charge in a district court, with Deputy Public Prosecutor (DPP) Kavita Uthrapathy in charge of prosecuting Heng, who was represented by Niklaus Tan and Philip Fong. In their mitigation plea, Heng's defence lawyers asked for 18 months' jail, and stated that Heng was coerced and manipulated by Lee to commit the crime, and two psychiatrists, Dr Kenneth Koh and Dr Brian Yeo, testified that Heng was suffering from low intellect and it also affected his state of mind at the time of the kidnapping. After hearing the prosecution's case and mitigation plea from the defence, District Judge Hamidah Ibrahim sentenced Heng to jail for three years on the same date of Heng's conviction. As he was aged more than 50 at the time of sentencing, Heng was spared the cane.

Heng, whose jail term was backdated to the month of his arrest, was granted parole and released early in January 2016 after he served his term with good behaviour. He also appeared in court to testify during the trial of his former lover and accomplice Lee Sze Yong, whose kidnapping trial began seven months after he was released.

== Trial of Lee Sze Yong ==
On 30 August 2016, Lee Sze Yong officially stood trial for one count of kidnapping for ransom at the High Court. Lee's pro bono lawyers Selva K Naidu and Tham Lijing argued that he was not guilty of kidnapping even though he had abducted Ng Lye Poh, since he had the intention to release Ng by the end of the day even if he did not receive the ransom on time, and aside from his confession during the trial to formulating his plot to kidnap the rich for ransom a few years before, Lee testified that he indeed had that intention to release Ng even if no ransom was paid, which was refuted by the prosecution.

On 1 December 2016, Justice Chan Seng Onn, the trial judge, delivered his verdict. He found Lee guilty of kidnapping for ransom, stating that even if it was true that Lee did intend to release Ng even without getting the ransom on time, the defence's interpretation of the law was "unduly restrictive" and "untenable" since the Kidnapping Act was implemented to convict kidnappers who had the intent to subject their victims and their families to fear of possible harm and extort money, and by having abducted and wrongly confined Ng with the motive to get ransom from Ng's son, Lee had effectively committed the offence of kidnapping by ransom, which attracts either death or life imprisonment with/without caning upon conviction.

In his personal letter to the court before sentencing, Lee pleaded for the death penalty, as he had destroyed his life and he was unable to face the prospect of hopelessly spending the rest of his natural life in jail and would rather hang for his crime. However, in his sentencing remarks, Justice Chan Seng Onn personally addressed Lee in court, advising him to not lose hope as there was still a chance for him to reform, and stated that under the law, offenders serving life sentences in Singapore were entitled to the possibility of release on parole after spending minimally 20 years behind bars. Justice Chan also noted that the prosecution did not seek the death penalty but asked for a life sentence with three strokes of the cane, which the defence did not object to. In the end, Justice Chan sentenced 44-year-old Lee Sze Yong to life in prison and three strokes of the cane, and his life term was backdated to the date of his arrest on 9 January 2014.

Lim Hock Chee, Ng's son, told the press that he found the sentence fair, and he stated he maintained his belief in the law and judges throughout the proceedings. He also stated that he and his family had since moved on from the incident.

== Lee Sze Yong's appeal ==
On 22 March 2017, Lee Sze Yong's appeal against his conviction was dismissed by the Court of Appeal.

Lee, who argued the appeal alone without a lawyer, told the appellate court that he was not guilty of kidnapping by ransom. He said that while he did abduct the elderly victim Ng Lye Poh for ransom, he had the intent to release Ng even when the ransom was not paid by the end of the day, and his actions did not fit the definition of kidnapping with intent to get ransom and receiving it under the Kidnapping Act. However, Chief Justice Sundaresh Menon, one of the three judges hearing the appeal, rejected Lee's defence and he said that under the Kidnapping Act, if a person has the intent to extort ransom when abducting a person, the offender was considered guilty of kidnapping for ransom regardless of whether the offender had received the ransom or not, and regardless of whether or not the offender had the intention to release the victim with/without the ransom.

Lee is presently incarcerated at Changi Prison since January 2014. Although life imprisonment in Singapore was construed as a term of incarceration for the rest of a prisoner's natural life since the 1997 landmark appeal of Abdul Nasir Amer Hamsah, Lee would still be granted a possible release on parole after completing a minimum period of 20 years behind bars, provided that he served with good behaviour in jail.

== Response and aftermath ==
The case of Ng Lye Poh's abduction, dubbed the Sheng Siong kidnapping in Singaporean media, had shocked the nation, as kidnapping was an extremely rare crime to happen in Singapore. It was a contrast to the 1950s and 1960s, when many rich businessmen and/or their family members were frequently targeted by kidnappers for ransom in Singapore, and some of these cases were recalled due to the Sheng Siong kidnapping. Due to the rampant occurrence of kidnappings back in that era, the government of Singapore passed laws in 1961 to allow courts to impose either the death penalty or life imprisonment for offenders convicted of kidnapping for ransom.

Shortly after the arrests of Heng Chen Boon and Lee Sze Yong, Prime Minister Lee Hsien Loong commended the police for the swift arrest of the two men, which took place within 12 hours after the crime was first reported. Deputy Prime Minister and Minister for Home Affairs Teo Chee Hean similarly commended the police for their swift efforts to bring the perpetrators to justice, and also stated that the Lim family had done the right thing to report the matter to the police. DPM Teo also reiterated that kidnapping was a serious crime and reassured the public that both the kidnappers would be subjected to the full extent of the law.

In total, 39 police officers, two departments and four units were applauded and awarded for their efforts in arresting the two kidnappers.

The victim, Ng Lye Poh, died at the age of 91 on 5 September 2026.

== See also ==
- Caning in Singapore
- Capital punishment in Singapore
- Life imprisonment in Singapore
- List of major crimes in Singapore
- Kidnapping Act (Singapore)
- List of kidnappings
