= Valencia CF Foundation =

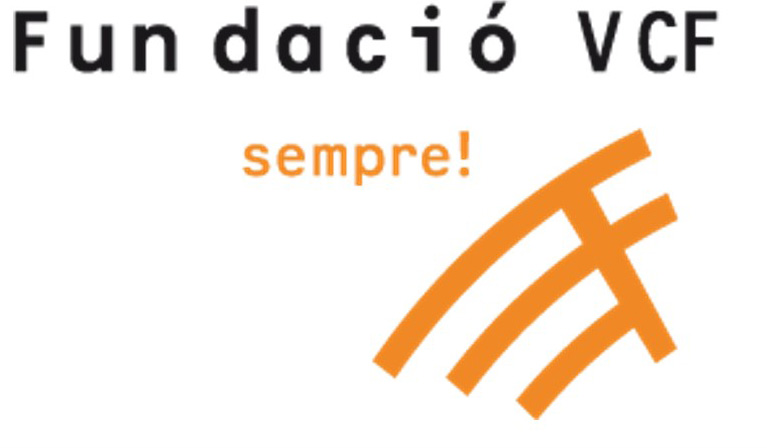
- Founder: [Valencia CF]
- Location: Valencia, Spain
- Website: FundacionVCF.com

Valencia CF Foundation is a nonprofit organisation whose function is to promote the historical heritage of the Valencia Football Club in Spain. It supports the underprivileged through sports and encourages attachment to the city of Valencia.

== History ==
Although there is no clear account of when the Foundation was created (possibly between 1992–1994), it is thought to have been conceived after the conversion of Valencia CF into a "Public limited sports company" or S.A.D. (Sociedad Anónima Deportiva).

The Foundation gained notoriety in the summer of 2009 when it received a loan from Bancaja (now known as Bankia) allowing the football club to avoid bankruptcy. The Foundation took 72% of the club's shares, becoming the majority shareholder. This loan was backed by the Valencian Finance Institute (IVF) which belongs to the Valencian government.

After years of delaying payments to the government of Valencia (sponsor) and Bankia (main creditor of the club), during the General Meeting of Shareholders on December 10, 2013, the Foundation decided to sell its shares. On February 24, 2014, a Management Committee for sale was created, including a representative from each of the following 4 parties: Valencia CF, the VCF Foundation, Bankia, and the Generalitat Valenciana. Between April and May of that year, seven offers were received and considered for the purchase of the shares. The final vote of the 22 patrons of the VCF Foundation took place on May 17, 2014. After months of tough negotiations, the shares were sold on October 24, 2014 to Peter Lim, through his company, Meriton Holdings, which presently manages and directs Valencia CF.

== Objectives ==
In order to comply with the objectives of the VCF Foundation, three main areas of activity were created:

=== Culture and roots ===
This area is related to the historical heritage of the club. The Department of Heritage researches, catalogs, restores, and preserves all kinds of related items such as trophies, historical shirts, and significant documents like the Constitution Act which governs the Mestalla's boardroom. All of these objects are in the Museum of Valencia CF at the Mestalla and can be visited on a tour of its most significant spaces such as the VIP box, the exhibition title, the mixed zone, and the press room, among other places.

On May 8, 2015, the Ministry of Education, Culture and Sports officially recognized the Valencia CF Museum as a museum of Valencia. Next to the museum there is a plan to build a Center for Documentation and Research that will preserve and disseminate the documented heritage of Valencia CF.

=== Social and charitable responsibility ===
This area is responsible for solidarity initiatives. These initiatives are aimed at reaching the maximum number of people and giving priority to the most deprived. Collaboration with other entities that share objectives and interests in solidarity with the Foundation is also taken into account.

=== Education and health ===
This area will focus on encouraging innovation in sport from various disciplines such as medicine, physical education, sports law and technology, and enhancing different Masters, seminars, conferences and specialized courses taught by the Training Center.

Collaboration with universities and institutions linked to education and healthy habits among the club's supporters and society in general, are promoted.
