= Azuar Ahamad =

Singaporean serial sex offender

- 2009 police mugshot of Azuar bin Ahamad
- Born: Azuar bin Ahamad; 1969 (age 56–57); Singapore
- Occupation: Logistics executive (2008; former)
- Children: 1
- Status: Incarcerated at Changi Prison since 15 August 2009
- Convictions: 2003; Molestation (one count); Causing hurt by using a sedative (one count); 2012; Sexual assault by penetration (one count); Rape (three counts)
- Criminal charges: 2003; Molestation (one count); Causing hurt by using a sedative (one count); 2009; Sexual assault by penetration (three counts); Rape (five counts); Molestation (14 counts); Causing hurt by using a sedative (four counts); Theft (four counts); Possession of obscene films (three counts)
- Penalty: 2003; Six years' imprisonment 2014; 37 1/2 years' imprisonment and 24 strokes of the cane

Azuar bin Ahamad was a Singaporean and convicted sex offender who was charged in 2009 with raping 22 women (aged between 18 and 38), whom he targeted through internet use and met them, spiking their drinks and sexually assaulted them. Azuar's crime spree lasted between December 2008 and August 2009 before he was caught. Following his plea of guilt, Azuar was found guilty of three counts of rape and one count of sexual assault by penetration, while 29 other charges were taken into consideration during sentencing. He was previously convicted and jailed for molestation back in 2003.

Azuar, who denied drugging his victims despite his admission to the charges, was described by the prosecution as Singapore's "worst serial rapist" for his aggravated sex crimes (33 counts in total) and as a result of the premeditated nature of his crimes, his high propensity to re-offend and his lack of remorse, Azuar was sentenced to 37 1/2 years in prison and 24 strokes of the cane by Justice Chan Seng Onn of the High Court.

== Personal life ==
=== Early life and family ===
Azuar bin Ahamad was born in Singapore in 1969. He was married twice in his adulthood, but both his marriages ended with a divorce each. Azuar also had one daughter (aged 13 as of May 2014) from one of his previous marriages.

=== 2003 molestation charge and first jail term ===
In 2003, Azuar bin Ahamad, then 34 years old, was brought to court for an offence of having molested a woman after drugging her with a sedative. He was sentenced to six years' imprisonment, and was released in March 2006 on parole, and he worked as a logistics executive after the completion of his jail term. However, 21 months after his release, Azuar would once again re-offend and commit more sexual offences from 2008 and 2009.

== 2008 – 2009 serial sex offences ==
=== Modus operandi ===
Between December 2008 and August 2009, Azuar bin Ahamad had targeted 22 women (aged between 18 and 38) and committed various sex crimes against them, including rape and molestation. His modus operandi was to befriend his victims via social media platforms like Facebook, and under his different aliases on the internet, he arranged to meet up with the victims at nightclubs, and introduce himself as a dental surgeon or businessman or student etc. Azuar would also add sedatives like Dormicum pills to the alcoholic drinks he bought for the victims before giving them to drink. After the victims gradually lose consciousness, Azuar would bring them to hotels or their homes, where he molested or raped them, and even stole from some of them and filmed himself each time he raped or molested the victims. A majority of these cases took place while he was out on bail twice in 2009 for a few instances of molesting or drugging a few of his victims. None of the 22 victims (except for one) were named to protect their identity.

=== First arrest and subsequent 2009 cases ===
On 27 October 2008, 30-year-old personal banker Tan Hui Ling (the only named victim of Azuar) first met Azuar at a cafe, after he arranged to meet with her to discuss insurance products. Tan was not sexually assaulted like the rest of Azuar's victims, but she was knocked out after drinking the coffee bought by Azuar, who had mixed the sedatives inside the coffee. Azuar was said to have helped leading Tan out of the cafe when Tan's boyfriend Lee Jun Jep appeared to bring his girlfriend back home, after he observed the meeting between Azuar and Tan while sitting at a separate table. According to Lee, Tan fell asleep in his car and he brought her to hospital. Tan, who felt lightheaded and drowsy and was moving unsteadily due to the effects of drugs, did not have memory of what happened except for being asked to take a urine test.

For this offence of drugging Tan, Azuar was arrested and charged, before he was released a day later on a bail of $30,000. However, Azuar went on to commit more offences of rape and molestation using the same modus operandi. Four of these subsequent cases, which were related to the proceeded charges made by the prosecution, were mentioned in detail during Azuar's trial hearing.

On 20 March 2009, Azuar arranged for a meeting with a 38-year-old insurance agent at a nightclub and bought her an alcoholic shot, which he spiked with sedatives. The woman remembered she was walking out of the bar about five minutes later and having blurred vision, and she would wake up in her home the next day. While she was unconscious, Azuar sexually assaulted her by penetration while inside her home, and filmed down the act with his phone.

On 24 April 2009, a 36-year-old sales assistant met Azuar at a nightclub. She drank three glasses of liquor mixed with water and ice, and an alcoholic shot bought by Azuar, who spiked the shot with drugs. After she drank it, she took a few steps and had no memory of what happened afterwards, and she woke up the next morning in a hotel room. Azuar actually brought her to the hotel and raped her, and also filmed it on his phone.

On 10 May 2009, a 32-year-old bank officer had drinks with Azuar after meeting up with him. She had three or four glasses of beer, wine or vodka, and also consumed an alcoholic shot which Azuar offered to her after he secretly spiked the drink. After drinking it, the woman felt giddy and drowsy shortly after and she fell unconscious, before waking up the next morning in a hotel. Similar to the two victims, Azuar had raped her while she was unconscious and filmed the act with his phone.

On 4 July 2009, a 27-year-old bank senior associate and Azuar both met at the nightclub, and after the woman drank a chocolate martini, Azuar ordered her two alcoholic shots (both of which he secretly mixed with sedatives), which the woman finished within minutes. After drinking them, the woman had no memory of what happened afterwards and she woke up the next morning in a hotel. Like the previous three aforementioned victims, Azuar raped the fourth woman after taking her to the hotel while she was unconscious. He also filmed down the act.

=== Subsequent arrests and revelation ===
On 31 July 2009, Azuar was arrested for the second time for molesting one of his 22 victims while out on bail. He was once again released on court bail of $40,000 on 1 August 2009.

On 15 August 2009, Azuar was arrested for the third and final time on another charge of molesting another one of his 22 victims. This time round, Azuar was remanded and his bail was revoked. It was at this point when Azuar's handphone was seized by the police for investigations, and they found 41 clips of women being undressed and raped or molested by Azuar. This led to the authorities fully realizing the true magnitude of Azuar's offences, and he was thus charged with a total of 33 offences varying from rape, molestation, filming sex clips to theft.

== Trial proceedings ==
Three years after his final arrest and remand, Azuar bin Ahamad's trial took place at the High Court on 6 August 2012. The trial was presided by Justice Chan Seng Onn of the High Court. The prosecution consisted of David Khoo, Andrew Tan and Krystle Chiang of the Attorney-General's Chambers (AGC), while Azuar was represented by Suresh Damodara and Leonard Manoj Kumar Hazra.

=== Plea of guilt and submissions ===
As his trial was ongoing, Azuar pleaded guilty to three counts of rape and one count of sexual assault by penetration, which were the preferred charges made against him by the prosecution, and he was therefore convicted. He also agreed to have 29 other charges taken into consideration during sentencing. However, before his sentencing trial commenced, Azuar denied that he had spiked the other victims (although he only admitted to spiking only Tan Hui Ling) before committing these sexual offences, claiming that the victims were intoxicated by alcohol and he thus took the chance to commit these offences, and added that he believed some of the victims were willing to have sex with him. Azuar's defence counsel conceded the heinous nature of their client's offences, but they also argued that the victims had little to no memory of being sexually assaulted by Azuar due to their unconsciousness, hence in comparison to precedent cases of rape, their trauma cannot be said to be as severe as those who were raped while retaining their consciousness, and asked that the sentence should not be high in Azuar's case. Azuar also submitted a personal letter pleading for a lenient sentence, stating that he regretted his actions and even asked to be released early to take care of his elderly mother, who had a heart condition.

In rebuttal, the prosecution directed the court's attention to the aggravating factors of the case, including the premeditation behind Azuar's actions of meeting the victims, drugging them and sexually assaulting them and filming down the sexual acts. The prosecution stated that the filming of these sexual acts "debased" his victims due to them fearing that it may be circulated or have copies of these clips, and Azuar also did the acts without protection, which exposed his victims to the risk of contracting sexually transmitted infections given his promiscuity. They also referred to Azuar's previous conviction of molesting a woman after drugging her, and stated that Azuar was "the worst serial rapist ever to be dealt with in Singapore" for his sexual attacks on innocent women. As such, the prosecution sought a sentence of not less than 45 years in prison and maximum caning sentence of 24 strokes for Azuar.

=== Newton hearing and medical evidence ===
Aside from this, a Newton hearing (also known as a trial-within-a-trial) was conducted to hear the victims' testimonies and those of medical experts to determine whether Azuar had indeed drugged the victims, which may be a crucial factor in prescribing his sentence. The victims stated that they had a high tolerance for alcohol, and stated that after having the drinks provided by Azuar, they felt dizzy and later lost consciousness within minutes, and later woke up either in a hotel room or their own homes. Medical experts, including pharmacist Tan Boon Tat and psychiatrist Munidasa Winslow also testified that the effects of the Dormicum pills (used by Azuar to drug the victims) to cause a person losing consciousness would happen within minutes, while alcohol could cause a person to lose consciousness at a slower rate, which may be a few hours or so at least. Evidence also emerged that Azuar had purchased hundreds of sleeping pills from doctors, telling them lies that he cannot sleep due to the deaths of his daughter and two former wives, even though they were all alive.

A government psychiatrist, Dr John Bosco Lee, also testified that Azuar voluntarily seek counselling sessions from him, but Dr Lee was wary of the motive he may have behind his willingness to consult a psychiatrist for counselling. Dr Lee also assessed Azuar and found him to be a pathological liar and had a personality disorder, and even cited Azuar's various actions of posing as different people and lying to many doctors to get sedative pills to support his assessment.

== Sentencing and imprisonment (2014) ==
On 27 May 2014, two years after Azuar's conviction, Justice Chan Seng Onn delivered his verdict on sentence.

In his judgement, Justice Chan accepted the victims' testimony and agreed with the prosecution that Azuar had indeed drugged them before he either raped or molested them, citing that their loss of consciousness was more consistent with the effects of sedative pills, and Azuar had repeatedly lied to distance himself from the guilt of intentionally drugging his victims. Justice Chan also found that Azuar's offences had been carried out with a high level of premeditation and he did not "sense true remorse in this case", he continued preying on innocent victims while out on bail, and the judge commented that it was by sheer luck that he was caught by the boyfriend of his attempted victim and it gradually exposed his string of offences committed. Justice Chan also branded Azuar as someone who posed a great danger to society and he saw little to no possibility of rehabilitation in Azuar's case.

As such, Justice Chan sentenced 44-year-old Azuar bin Ahamad to a total of 37 1/2 years in prison and 24 strokes of the cane for three counts of rape and one count of sexual assault by penetration. The sentence was backdated to 15 August 2009, the date of his final arrest. At that time, the longest jail term given to a convicted sex offender in Singapore was 42 years, which Bala Kuppusamy received in 2009 for robbing seven women and sexually assaulted three of them.

It was revealed in July 2014 that Azuar appealed against his sentence, but no outcome was reported and the duration of his sentence remained at 37 years and six months.

Currently, Azuar is incarcerated at Changi Prison since 15 August 2009. Should he served his jail term with good behaviour, Azuar would be granted parole and released at age 65 in 2034 after completing at least two-thirds of his sentence (equivalent to 25 years).

== Aftermath of second conviction ==
During the time Azuar was still imprisoned, a Singaporean Chinese-language crime show titled The Convict re-enacted the serial rapes and molestation committed by Azuar from 2008 to 2009. While the case was largely similar to Azuar's, some details were fictionalized and the characters re-modelled after the offender and victims were portrayed by Chinese Singaporean actors (due to the show being a Chinese-language program). For instance, Azuar, who was a Malay Singaporean, was renamed as Zhang Lijie and his counterpart was portrayed by local actor Andrew Lua (who was Chinese Singaporean).

Azuar's prison sentence of 37 years and six months was listed as one of the longest jail terms imposed by the courts for sexual crimes within Singapore's jurisdiction.

The case of Azuar also called for the need for many female workers in Singaporean society to be more cautious when having business dealings with clients in similar settings as Azuar meeting his victims. A 26-year-old assistant marketing manager also spoke up that she was nearly sexually harassed by a 50-year-old client before her boyfriend managed to intervene and asked her to be careful.

== See also ==
- Bala Kuppusamy
- Caning in Singapore
- List of major crimes in Singapore
