= Murder of Lee Kok Cheong =

1993 murder of a NUS professor in Singapore

Lee Kok Cheong
- Lee Kok Cheong, the murdered professor
- Born: Lee Kok Cheong; 1939; Singapore, Straits Settlements
- Died: 12 December 1993 (aged 54); Holland Road, Singapore
- Cause of death: Strangulation
- Education: University
- Occupation: Professor
- Employer: National University of Singapore
- Known for: Murder victim

On the evening of 12 December 1993, Lee Kok Cheong (李国祥 Lǐ Guóxiáng) (Note: His Chinese name was also spelt as 李国昌 Lǐ Guóchāng) was at his home in Greenleaf Place along Holland Road, when three youths entered his house to commit robbery. Two of the attackers stabbed Lee, then strangled him, which caused his death. Lee, an associate professor at the National University of Singapore, was 54 years old at the time of his death.

The killers subsequently stole valuables from Lee's house and left his body in the house before its discovery two days later. Between 1997 and 2006, the three robbers were all arrested and charged with murder. One of the robbers was subsequently imprisoned and caned for lesser charges of robbery, theft and cheating, while the remaining two assailants, who were both involved in the strangulation of Lee, were found guilty of murder and sentenced to death in 1998 and 2006 respectively.

== Death of Lee Kok Cheong ==
=== Discovery of Lee's corpse ===
The bedroom of Lee Kok Cheong, where his body was found. Lee's feet were circled on the below right

On 14 December 1993, a man was discovered dead inside his house in Greenleaf Place along Holland Road. According to the press and police sources, the police responded to a report that the dead man's house had the lights on for two days and two nights, and it led to the discovery of the body. The man's partially decomposed corpse was reportedly found lying on the floor of the master bedroom, with a pillow covering his face, and his legs tied with a belt, and his hands were raised above his head and bound with telephone wire. The case was subsequently classified as murder. The police report was lodged by a maid working for the victim's neighbour, after she was informed by a newspaper vendor that the victim had not collected his newspapers, which were all left outside for the past two days.

The victim was identified as 54-year-old Lee Kok Cheong, who was an associate professor and Head of the English Proficiency Unit at National University of Singapore (NUS). According to his brother Lee Kok Fatt (李国发 Lǐ Guófā), he last saw his brother on 12 December 1993, two days before his death, when they went to collect red packet money for Lee's nephews in advance for the upcoming Chinese New Year of 1994. Lee's brother said that Lee informed him he would have two friends coming to his house to visit him later that evening. The police also found some uneaten servings of yong tau foo and chicken curry inside the kitchen of Lee's house and some drinks (mainly two opened cans of orange juice and one cup of Milo drink) on the coffee table of Lee's living room, which further corroborated the fact that Lee was receiving guests at his house on the day he was murdered. Since the house's door was left wide open and no signs of forced entry were found, it also suggested that the killer(s) were someone known to Lee, who was most likely killed two days before his body was found. Forensic pathologist Dr Paul Chui performed an autopsy, and confirmed that the victim died from strangulation.

Lee's murder was one of the two murder cases to be discovered on that day itself. The other case was the death of 32-year-old Tan Kee Fan, whose body was discovered inside a rubbish chute at another location in Singapore after she was killed. The case of Tan's death remains unsolved till today.

=== Background of Lee ===
Lee Kok Cheong was born in Singapore in 1939. He had two brothers Lee Kok Meng (李国明 Lǐ Guómíng) and Lee Kok Fatt (who worked as a taxi driver) in his family, and after completing his education, Lee became an associate professor at National University of Singapore (NUS), and became the university's Head of the English Proficiency Unit since it first opened in 1979. He was single and never married, and lived alone in his house at Holland Road after moving out of his Dover Crescent flat two years prior to the murder. Lee's students and colleagues remembered him as a kind, generous and easygoing man. A former student recalled that he once threw a big Christmas party in 1991 for his students and colleagues. Lee's neighbours told the press that he mostly kept to himself. He also had a hobby of collecting Chinese antiques. Lee, who took a year off from his teaching job at NUS, also had upcoming plans to go to England to do research; the week when Lee died happened to be the second week of his year-long vacation.

During the trial of one of Lee's murderers in August 1998, it was revealed that Lee was homosexual. Lee's family however, never knew about his sexuality, and had attempted to matchmake him with a woman to no avail. In his private life, Lee had several intimate relationships with young men, including at least eight undergraduates and ten other men outside the campus, including random strangers he befriended, and had a large collection of pornographic magazines about homosexual activities; this promiscuous habit gave Lee the nickname "Oriental Aunty". (Note: His nickname was also called Dong Fang Ah Yi, literally the same meaning as "Oriental Aunty" in Chinese.) Lee would also spend a lot on new designer clothes as gifts for his partners in spite of his usual habit of wearing plain clothes. Three of Lee's former students (whose identities remain anonymous) admitted that they voluntarily became Lee's lovers and had been intimate with him in the past, and one of Lee's boyfriends even went on an overseas holiday together with Lee. This habit of befriending random strangers to seek love was what ultimately cost Lee his life, since one of the men (whose murder trial led to the revelation of Lee's sexual preference) he befriended would become one of the three alleged murderers responsible for his brutal death.

== Police investigations ==
=== Investigations and 1995 tip-off ===
The police began to investigate the murder of Lee Kok Cheong, and they found that after his death, his ATM card was still in use, and about S$3,400 in cash were withdrawn from his bank account. A brown wallet, a gold chain, some gold bangles, S$1,200 in cash, and also the ATM card in question were confirmed to be stolen from his house. Several shops in some shopping malls across the whole of Singapore were traced by the police, where the purchases using Lee's card were made. About S$3,900 worth of items, including clothes, shoes and jewellery, were procured using Lee's card, and the shop owners or employees were asked to identify the buyers on the captured CCTV images, whom the police classified as possible suspects of the crime. Based on the testimonies of the owners or employees, a group of three youths came by to make these purchases.

In April 1994, the police made a public appeal for information to trace the whereabouts of the three suspects (described to be in their twenties and around 1.7m in height), and Singaporean crime show Crimewatch also re-enacted the case to put up a public notice to locate the suspects. Two years after the murder of Lee Kok Cheong, the police received a mysterious phone call, with an unknown caller provided a tip-off to the police, telling them that one of the suspects was known by his alias "Nelson", and he was a waiter of a karaoke lounge in Singapore, but he went missing after the murder. This allowed police to have a major progress in their investigations (led by police detective Richard Lim Beng Gee), and eventually, the police were able to arrest "Nelson" and one of his two accomplices between December 1997 and May 1998 respectively.

=== Arrest of Too Yin Sheong ===
On 23 December 1997, four years after the murder of Lee Kok Cheong, the police finally arrested "Nelson", a 25-year-old Malaysian who was entering Singapore with his girlfriend through the Woodlands Checkpoint. "Nelson", whose real name was Too Yin Sheong (杜延雄 Dù Yánxióng), (Note: His other aliases include "Ah Chai" and "Gong Kia" (translated as "idiot" in Hokkien)) became the first member of the trio to be arrested for killing Lee. Too, who celebrated his 26th birthday on 26 December 1997, was charged with murder on Christmas Eve (a day after his capture).

Background information showed that Too, a secondary school drop-out, had one younger brother and two older sisters, and he was working as the manager of a karaoke lounge in Johor Bahru prior to his arrest for the murder, and both his mother and stepfather were permanent residents living in Singapore. In fact, after he allegedly killed Lee, Too never entered Singapore for more than three years since 1993 before he once again entered Singapore in August 1997 to attend the funeral of his late younger brother Yin Seng (who died from a car crash at the age of 23). Before his arrest, Too was making his second entry into Singapore with plans to celebrate his birthday and visit his mother. (Note: Some sources however, claimed that Too finished visiting his mother and he was arrested at the Woodlands Checkpoint while he was leaving Singapore for Malaysia.)

=== Arrest of Ng Chek Siong ===
On 20 May 1998, a second suspect, Ng Chek Siong (黄哲祥 Huáng Zhéxiáng; alias Koo Neng (Note: "Koo Neng" meant "Tortoise Egg" in Hokkien; also spelt as Koo Nerng)), was arrested in Muar, Johor by the Royal Malaysia Police and extradited back to Singapore for trial. Two days later, Ng was charged with murder, as well as cheating and theft for having stole Lee's money and ATM card and made unauthorized transactions under the victim's name.

Before his arrest, Ng, also a Malaysian, was married with a daughter (aged three in 1998) and a son (aged nine months in August 1998). His hometown was in Muar, Johor, where he also worked as a helper in his father's durian plantation. Ng and Too were both held in remand awaiting trial for murder, while the police continued to trace the whereabouts of the third and final suspect, only known by his nickname "Kim Beh". (Note: "Kim Beh" was translated as "Golden Horse" in Hokkien.)

== Trial of Ng Chek Siong (1998) ==
Ng Chek Siong
- 1998 police mugshot of Ng Chek Siong
- Born: Ng Chek Siong; 1971 (age 54–55); Malaysia
- Other names: Koo Neng; Koo Nerng
- Occupations: Durian plantation worker (former); Renovation contractor (former)
- Spouse: Unnamed wife
- Children: 1 son and 1 daughter
- Status: Released since October 2003
- Motive: Robbery
- Convictions: Robbery (one count); Theft (two counts); Cheating (five counts)
- Criminal charges: Murder (one count); Theft (five charges); Cheating (11 counts)
- Penalty: Eight years' imprisonment and ten strokes of the cane

About three months after he was arrested, Ng Chek Siong's murder charge was reduced to robbery. Ng pleaded guilty to the reduced charge, as well as five other counts of cheating and two counts of theft. Six other charges of cheating and three other charges of theft were taken into consideration during sentencing.

In mitigation, Ng's defence counsel argued that Ng only acted as a driver of the trio's get-away car, and he was remorseful of the fact that Lee Kok Cheong died as a result of the robbery. It was revealed that after the crime, Ng continued to go in and out of Singapore (where he worked as a freelance renovation contractor) until April 1994, when he discovered through a newspaper that he and Too and "Kim Beh" were on the police's wanted list and the publication of their photos, and this led to him realizing that Lee had been murdered, and he thus went into hiding in Muar, where he stayed until May 1998, when the Malaysian police managed to locate him and place him under arrest.

On 14 August 1998, 27-year-old Ng was sentenced to a total of eight years' imprisonment and ten strokes of the cane. Justice M P H Rubin, who presided Ng's trial, imposed six years and caning of ten strokes for the robbery charge, one year for each of the theft charges, and two years for each of the cheating charges, before he ordered that the two-year sentence for one of the cheating charges should be served consecutively with the six-year term for robbery. The sentence was backdated to Ng's date of arrest.

Ng was released on parole since October 2003, after he served two-thirds of his sentence (equivalent to five years and four months) with good behaviour, and had since repatriated to Malaysia.

Ng's trial for robbing Lee took place just three days before the first suspect, Too Yin Sheong, would go on trial for murder.

== Trial of Too Yin Sheong (1998) ==
=== Trial hearing ===
Too Yin Sheong
- 1997 police mugshot of Too Yin Sheong
- Born: Too Yin Sheong; 26 December 1971; Malaysia
- Died: 30 April 1999 (aged 27); Changi Prison, Singapore
- Cause of death: Execution by hanging
- Other names: Nelson; Ah Chai; Gong Kia
- Occupation: Karaoke lounge manager (former)
- Status: Executed
- Motive: Robbery
- Conviction: Murder (one count)
- Criminal charges: Murder (one count); Theft (five charges); Cheating (11 counts)
- Penalty: Death (mandatory)

On 17 August 1998, 26-year-old Too Yin Sheong stood trial at the High Court for one count of murdering Lee Kok Cheong five years before. Too also faced multiple counts of cheating and theft, but these were stood down by the prosecution in the course of his murder trial. Too was represented by Ramesh Tiwary, while the prosecution was led by Lee Sing Lit. The trial was presided by Judicial Commissioner Chan Seng Onn.

According to Too's confession, in October 1993, he first met Lee Kok Cheong at a coffee shop along Dover Crescent, where Lee was a regular customer. On their first meeting, Lee eagerly approached him and offered to befriend him, and even left his phone number and residential address. Three weeks later, Too was invited to Lee's house, and Lee showed him around his house, and even told him where he bought his Chinese antiques. After they sat down to talk, Lee started to get close to Too, touching his body and thighs. Too, who realized Lee was homosexual, grew uncomfortable and thus made an excuse to make his leave from Lee's house. Too said that he relayed his experience at the house with his two Malaysian friends: Ng Chek Siong and the missing third accomplice "Kim Beh". He also told the pair that Lee kept a lot of antiques in his house and assumed that Lee was wealthy. After hearing this, "Kim Beh" suggested robbing the professor, and he asked Too to arrange a meeting on the pretext of introducing "Kim Beh" to Lee, so that the trio could gain entry to Lee's house.

On 12 December 1993, the day of the murder, Ng drove both Too and "Kim Beh" to Lee's house, where Lee prepared food to treat Too and "Kim Beh" under the belief that Too wanted him to meet "Kim Beh". After both "Kim Beh" and Too entered the house, the pair restrained Lee and brought him into the master bedroom, where Lee had his hands and feet tied up. According to Too, it was "Kim Beh" who murdered Lee by strangling him to death: he stated that after they tied up Lee, who pleaded with them to not harm him, "Kim Beh" left the room and retrieved an electrical cord, which "Kim Beh" used to strangle Lee, who was also stabbed with a knife by "Kim Beh". Too said he never took part in the strangulation, and he left the room prior to the strangulation, which he witnessed from outside the room. Overall, Too's defence was he only wanted to rob Lee, and he never killed Lee or even intended to kill Lee, and he also was confused, frightened and distraught at the actions of "Kim Beh", which caused him to, in a moment of helplessness and cowardice, not step in to save Lee from being killed.

However, the prosecution rebutted Too's evidence, and they described him as a "cold-blooded killer" who never stepped in to stop "Kim Beh" from strangling Lee or try to save Lee. They stated that from the onset, it was inherently clear that both Too and "Kim Beh", together with Ng (who was outside the house and on the lookout) shared the common intention to rob Lee, and both Too and "Kim Beh" were equally responsible for killing Lee. The prosecution pointed out that even though it may be true that "Kim Beh" was the only person who strangled Lee to death, Too likely knew about the actions of "Kim Beh" and never intervened out of the need to silence Lee and prevent Lee to report them to the police and identify them, and he was not a mere bystander or passive follower as he claimed to be. Too's subsequent actions of stealing the valuables from Lee's house and using the money (including those he received from selling some of the stolen items) to buy himself a new ring and go shopping, were also corroborative of the fact that Too was never in a state of confusion or distraught at the death of Lee Kok Cheong. Hence, the prosecution sought a guilty verdict of murder in Too's trial.

Closing submissions were made on 24 August 1998, and the verdict was scheduled to be given four days later on 28 August 1998.

=== Verdict ===
On 28 August 1998, the trial judge - Judicial Commissioner Chan Seng Onn - delivered his verdict.

In his two-hour long judgement, Judicial Commissioner Chan found that Too played a "passive" part in the murder of Lee by doing nothing to help the professor while the missing accomplice "Kim Beh" was strangling Lee Kok Cheong to death. He accepted that it was solely "Kim Beh" who had directly murdered Lee by strangulation, but he stated that Too should be held equally responsible for the actions of "Kim Beh" since the latter did so in furtherance of the common intention to rob Lee, and Too's decision to leave the room showed that he had a cool frame of mind to let "Kim Beh" finish off Lee to ensure they leave no witnesses to their crime, indicating he was agreeable with causing Lee's death as the probable consequence of their joint intention and actions. Too's absence from the scene of the murder was also not a valid excuse to exonerate himself from the blame of killing Lee.

Judicial Commissioner Chan also cited that after murdering Lee, Too went on to steal Lee's ATM card to withdraw the victim's money and spent them on shopping for new clothes and jewellery for himself and his two accomplices, and these actions were not supposed to come from someone who become "confused, shocked, frightened and traumatised" at the sight of a murder. Judicial Commissioner Chan also inferred that Too never had any remorse for having abetted the murder and used the victim's money to lavishly spend for themselves. He stated that it was a natural human instinct to help someone in trouble, and Too was inhumane for not acting on that instinct and left Lee to die as the victim of, in the judge's words, a "cold-blooded, brutal and ruthless murder".

Therefore, 26-year-old Too Yin Sheong was found guilty of murder and sentenced to death. Under Section 302 of the Penal Code, the death penalty was mandated as the sole punishment for murder in Singapore. Too was reportedly crestfallen when the death sentence was passed, and he was given a chance to speak to mother and stepfather, who both asked his lawyer to appeal their son's sentence.

=== Appeal ===
On 10 November 1998, Too's appeal against his conviction and sentence was dismissed by the Court of Appeal. The three judges - Chief Justice Yong Pung How, and two Judges of Appeal L P Thean (Thean Lip Ping) and M Karthigesu - upheld the murder conviction and death sentence of Too on the grounds that he played an active role behind the murder and shared the common intention with Kim Beh to commit murder aside from their intent to rob, since he never stepped in to stop the missing accomplice "Kim Beh" from strangling Lee to death, and the element of omission in this case was also considered a crime.

=== Execution ===
On 30 April 1999, 27-year-old Too Yin Sheong was hanged in Changi Prison at dawn. On the same day, a 39-year-old drug trafficker named Gurbajant Singh was executed at the same prison.

== Trial of Lee Chez Kee (2006) ==
=== Arrest of Lee Chez Kee ===
In the aftermath of Too Yin Sheong's execution and Ng Chek Siong's imprisonment, the final suspect "Kim Beh" remained at large for a total of 13 years before he was finally arrested in February 2006 and charged with murdering Lee Kok Cheong back in 1993.

"Kim Beh", whose real name was Lee Chez Kee (李哲奇 Lǐ Zhéqí), was first arrested by the Royal Malaysia Police in June 2005 for stealing a vehicle and jailed for more than a year in a Malaysian prison. Before his release, the authorities managed to link him to the murder of Lee Kok Cheong back in 1993, and therefore, the Singaporean authorities made arrangements with the Malaysian counterparts to extradite him back to Singapore for trial. On 17 February 2006, Lee Chez Kee was released from prison, but he was handed over to the Singaporean police and extradited back to Singapore for trial. The reason behind Chez Kee's capture was due to the uniqueness of his name's spelling, mainly the word "Chez" in his given name, which led to police scouring through the wanted list of Interpol and allowed the authorities to identify and capture Chez Kee as the final suspect behind the murder of Lee Kok Cheong, for which Chez Kee was charged a day after his arrival in Singapore. Aside from the murder charge, another five counts of theft and four counts of cheating were tendered against Chez Kee in his charge sheet for having used Lee's money and ATM card for shopping.

=== Trial hearing ===
Lee Chez Kee
- Born: Lee Chez Kee c. 1971; Malaysia
- Died: c. 2009 (aged 38); Changi Prison, Singapore
- Cause of death: Execution by hanging
- Other name: Kim Beh
- Status: Executed
- Motive: Robbery
- Conviction: Murder (one count)
- Criminal charges: Murder (one count); Theft (five charges); Cheating (four counts)
- Penalty: Death (mandatory)

On 18 September 2006, Lee Chez Kee stood trial at the High Court for murdering the professor Lee Kok Cheong back in 1993. Chez Kee was represented by Wendell Wong and Rupert Seah, while the prosecution consisted of Lee Cheow Han and Tan Wee Soon. High Court judge Tay Yong Kwang was appointed as the trial judge of Chez Kee's case. By that time, Too Yin Sheong was already executed for his part in the murder, while Ng Chek Siong, who had returned to Malaysia after his release, could not be located despite a court summons being served at the house of Ng's father; Ng never returned home for six months at the time of the summons. As a result, Ng was not brought in as a witness in Chez Kee's trial. In light of these circumstances, the prosecution sought to have Too's statements admitted as evidence against Chez Kee, while the defence counsel objected to admitting Too's confession on the basis that his reliability as a witness, as a result of his execution, cannot be scrutinized and it would prejudice Chez Kee in determining whether he was guilty or not.

Chez Kee maintained during his trial that he never killed the victim. Although Chez Kee did not deny that he had stabbed the professor and tied him up, Chez Kee stated he never killed the professor like what Too claimed in his 1998 trial. Chez Kee's version of events was that he went into the house, restrained Lee Kok Cheong before he left Too and the victim inside the master bedroom, ransacking the house for valuables. According to Chez Kee, the professor was still alive when he left the room and a few minutes later, after Too joined him, Chez Kee and Too left the house, and he stated the professor was still alive when the duo departed the house with the things they stole, although Chez Kee admitted he saw Too covering Lee's face with a pillow. He blamed Too for being the person who killed Lee, and he only wanted to commit robbery.

=== Verdict ===
On 11 October 2006, about 13 years after Lee Kok Cheong was murdered, Justice Tay Yong Kwang delivered his verdict in Lee Chez Kee's case.

In his verdict, Justice Tay rejected Chez Kee's contention that he was a mere participant of the robbery. He referred to a portion of Chez Kee's evidence, in which he admitted to arguing with Too before the crime about his fear of being recognized, which contradicted his testimony. Justice Tay referred that Chez Kee had played an active part in the robbery, and the strangulation was committed in furtherance of the common intention by Chez Kee, Too and Ng to commit robbery, such that the outcome of the robbery ended with the death of 54-year-old Lee Kok Cheong. He also stated that Chez Kee even used the stolen money and card to withdraw cash to purchase items for himself and his accomplices, and he also at one point, continued to travel in and out of Singapore until the arrest of Too in 1997, which could only be interpreted as Chez Kee knowing that the victim had died and consequently, there was no need for the trio to fear that the professor could identify the three of them and report them to the police.

Justice Tay accepted that it was the defendant who directed killed Lee Kok Cheong by strangulation, and he ruled that Too's confession should be admissible as evidence, although he acknowledged the dangers of relying on the confession of Too due to his death. Alternatively, even if Chez Kee was not the main perpetrator and Too was actually the one strangling the professor to death, it did not detract from the fact that Chez Kee and Too both acted in concert of their common intention to rob and subsequently, to silence Lee Kok Cheong by soliciting his death to prevent themselves from being identified and arrested for robbery.

Therefore, 35-year-old Lee Chez Kee was found guilty of murder and sentenced to death.

=== Appeal and execution ===
On 12 May 2008, by a rare split decision of 2 – 1, the Court of Appeal dismissed Lee Chez Kee's appeal against his conviction and sentence.

When making the appeal ruling, the three judges - Judge of Appeal V K Rajah and two High Court judges Woo Bih Li and Choo Han Teck - had different views on the admissibility of Too Yin Sheong's statements against Chez Kee, and it posed an issue since Too was put to death in 1999 and he cannot be questioned to further verify the validity and reliability of his evidence. Additionally, it addressed the question of using a dead accomplice's statements from a separate trial against a defendant in a subsequent trial. Both Justice Rajah and Justice Choo agreed that the statements should not be admitted as evidence, while Justice Woo dissented, stating that the statements should be considered as evidence against Lee in his trial. Also, the definition of common intention was also revised, with the Court of Appeal ruling that a secondary offender should be deemed as sharing the common intention to commit an offence with the principal offender, as long as he/she had the knowledge that the principal offender may potentially perpetuate actions that result in the offence convicted for.

However, when it came to the question of whether Chez Kee's murder conviction should stand, both Justice Rajah and Justice Woo agreed that Chez Kee was the primary offender who had murdered Lee Kok Cheong by strangulation, and hence his murder conviction and death sentence should be affirmed. Justice Rajah, who rejected the admissibility of Too's statements, felt that it was correct to convict Chez Kee of murdering the professor because he had knowledge that the victim would be killed and shared the common intent to silence Lee Kok Cheong by engineering his death, while Woo felt that while Too's statements were admissible, his self-serving parts should not be considered and the statements held little weight compared to the other sources of evidence that could return with a verdict of murder in Chez Kee's case. As for Justice Choo (who dissented regarding this matter), he felt that a re-trial should be given to Chez Kee since it was unsafe to rely on the unrebutted statements of Too to determine Chez Kee's guilt, and that it would prejudice Chez Kee in deciding whether to convict Chez Kee of murder. In conclusion, based on the majority opinion by Justice Woo and Justice Rajah, Chez Kee's appeal was accordingly dismissed.

After his death sentence was upheld, Lee Chez Kee was eventually hanged in Changi Prison, but the exact date of his execution in 2009 was unknown. (Note: Prison statistics showed that out of five executions that occurred in 2009 in Singapore, one was put to death for murder, indirectly confirming Chez Kee's death.)

== Aftermath ==
Around three years after Lee Chez Kee was hanged for murdering Lee Kok Cheong, in 2012, the Lee Kok Cheong murder case was re-enacted by Singaporean crime show In Cold Blood, and the re-enactment aired as the ninth episode of the show's second season. The identities of the victim and the three perpetrators involved were changed for dramatic purposes. For instance, the professor Lee Kok Cheong was renamed as "Phillip Lim Chuan" and portrayed by veteran Singaporean actor Laurence Pang; Too Yin Sheong was renamed as "Teo Ah Seng" and portrayed by Nicholas Bloodworth; singer-actor Ryan Lian portrayed Lee Chez Kee, who was renamed as "Koh Ah Chee"; and finally, Richson Lim portrayed Ng Chek Siong, who was re-addressed as "Chong" in the episode. The version of events depicted in the episode were based on the confession and account of Too Yin Sheong; the fictional character based on Too was portrayed in a more sympathetic light as a reluctant accomplice who never wanted to kill the victim but helpless to intervene, while the character modelled after Lee Chez Kee was more vicious and violent in attacking and murdering the professor.

In December 2024, Must Share News published the murder of Lee Kok Cheong in one of its original crime news series.

== See also ==
- Capital punishment in Singapore
