= 1999 Bukit Timah kidnapping =

1999 kidnapping case in Singapore

- Date: 9 September 1999
- Location: Bukit Timah, Singapore
- Motive: To get money to settle debts (Lee)
- Deaths: None
- Convicted: Vincent Lee Chuan Leong, 33; Shi Song Jing, 29; Zhou Jian Guang, 26
- Sentence: Life imprisonment

In September 1999, in an attempt to discharge his bankruptcy, 33-year-old Vincent Lee Chuan Leong (李泉梁 Lǐ Quánliáng), a Singaporean marketing manager, together with Shi Song Jing (施松进 Shī Sōngjìn) and Zhou Jian Guang (周建光 Zhōu Jiànguāng), both illegal immigrants from China, kidnapped a 14-year-old female student in Singapore. They abducted her into their rented car and demanded a S$500,000 ransom from the girl's father, a wealthy second-hand car dealer. The sum was lowered through negotiation to S$330,000. The ransom was paid and the girl released without harm.

Shortly after, Lee and his two accomplices were arrested by the Singapore Police Force. Lee was sentenced to life imprisonment for kidnapping by ransom. Shi and Zhou received the same sentence in a separate trial. After serving twenty years, ten months and nine days in jail, Lee was granted parole and released on 22 June 2020.

== Background of perpetrator ==
Vincent Lee Chuan Leong
- Lee, 1999 police mugshot
- Born: 1966 (age 59–60); Singapore
- Occupations: Marketing manager (former); Lorry driver (current)
- Status: Released on parole 22 June 2020
- Criminal charge: Kidnapping by ransom
- Penalty: Life imprisonment (with possibility of parole after twenty years)

Vincent Lee Chuan Leong, born in Singapore in 1966, was an academically inclined student who studied at the Presbyterian Boys' School before earning a double degree in mathematics and finance at university. Lee then worked as a marketing manager. He is a Christian and according to the pastor of the church Lee frequented, he was known for his good character. He counselled troubled youth who approached him, and even offered them free tuition. Many people from the church were shocked when his crime became known.

By August 1999, Lee was facing potential bankruptcy from share trading, and his heavily pregnant wife required expensive medical attention. The couple's first child, a son, was born in October or November 1999.

== The kidnap ==
=== Plot ===
Due to his desperation to pay off his debts, Lee decided to kidnap a girl for ransom, specifically a teenage girl who was the daughter of a rich family living in one of the affluent neighbourhoods in Bukit Timah. For his plan, Lee hired two illegal Chinese immigrants he met at a coffee shop near Hougang Plaza. One of the foreigners was 26-year-old Zhou Jian Guang, a China-born native of Fujian Province, who was married with a five-year-old son, and he first came to Singapore to work as a construction worker in order to build a house for his parents, wife and son. Since July 1999, he lost his job but continued to stay in Singapore. The other was 29-year-old Shi Song Jing, who came to Singapore from China in February 1997 due to him being duped about various well-paid jobs in Singapore. Shi was abandoned by his agent and he had to stay all alone in Singapore as an illegal immigrant for six months before getting a job as a plasterer. Both Zhou and Shi agreed to assist Lee in executing the kidnap plot.

Lee made a plan to abduct a target at Bukit Timah, starting with renting a van for the purpose of forcibly bringing their target into the van, and also rented a flat to use as their hideout and their place to confine the kidnap victim during the kidnapping. They also placed false license plates with false vehicle numbers on the van to avoid identification of their getaway vehicle.

=== Abduction of victim ===
Lee, Zhou, and Shi carried out their plan on 9 September 1999.

On the night itself, at Bukit Timah, a 14-year-old girl was walking back home to her house, and was abducted by Lee and his accomplices inside their get-away vehicle.

After kidnapping the girl, the trio held the victim for about 60 hours and kept her blindfolded and tied her hands, but they never mistreated the girl and promised they would not harm her, and even gave her food and water throughout her confinement. All the while during the confinement of the victim, Lee contacted the girl's father, who was a wealthy scrap car dealer. Lee demanded a ransom of S$500,000, though this was later reduced to S$330,000 after some negotiations between the father and Lee. During three of these phone calls, Lee allowed the girl to speak to her father.

The ransom was paid on the night of 11 September, after the father left a bag containing the money at a vacant plot of land in Tampines and Shi was told the retrieve it. Hours after the ransom was paid, Lee ordered Zhou to release the girl on the morning of 12 September, and the girl safely returned home that same day. All the while, the police were already in surveillance of the situation after the father reported the matter to the police and they were monitoring the movements of Lee, whom they locked in as a suspect due to them obtaining a record of him purchasing a new mobile phone with his credit card; that same phone was used by Lee to contact the girl's father and to allow her to speak to him.

=== Arrest ===
Twenty minutes after the confirmation of the girl's release and safety, a team of police investigators, led by Inspector Richard Lim Beng Gee, arrested 33-year-old Vincent Lee at his Pasir Ris five-room flat for the kidnapping. Both Zhou and Shi were subsequently arrested at a flat in Telok Blangah Crescent. All three of them were charged with kidnapping for purpose of extorting a ransom. It was further revealed that Zhou and Shi entrusted the ransom money to five other illegal Chinese immigrants to help them to remit the ransom money out of Singapore. These five people were also arrested, charged and later jailed for dishonestly receiving stolen property; S$214,400 were recovered by the police.

Under Section 3 of the Kidnapping Act, if found guilty of kidnapping by ransom, Lee, Zhou and Shi would be sentenced to either life imprisonment or the death penalty, with caning optionally to be imposed if the offender receives life imprisonment. The trio were later additionally charged with the attempted kidnapping of another 14-year-old girl in March 2000.

The kidnapping was the first reported kidnapping case to occur in Singapore in a decade. The last case of kidnapping happened in April 1989, when 56-year-old goldsmith Phang Tee Wah was kidnapped by two men – 50-year-old Ibrahim Masod and 44-year-old Liow Han Heng – and later killed, and the men also attempted to extort ransom despite the death of Phang. Both men were sentenced to death for kidnapping and murdering Phang, though only Ibrahim would eventually be hanged at Changi Prison on 29 July 1994, while Liow died of a heart attack in August 1993 before he could be executed.

== Trial proceedings ==
=== Lee's kidnapping trial ===
On 24 April 2000, 33-year-old Vincent Lee Chuan Leong first stood trial in the High Court for kidnapping the 14-year-old. By then, Lee submitted to the court his intention to plead guilty to the kidnapping charge. After receiving the plea, the High Court convicted Lee for kidnapping for ransom.

Lee's defence lawyer, Edmond Pereira, argued in his submissions for sentence that life imprisonment should be the appropriate punishment for Lee. He highlighted that Lee's financial difficulties were the motivation for his planning and execution of the kidnap plot. He stated that Lee confessed to his crime from the start and stuck to his story, and he also provided full cooperation during police investigations and his willingness to be a key witness for the prosecution against his two accomplices Shi Song Jing and Zhou Jian Guang, who both pleaded not guilty and set to claim trial on a later date. Pereira also emphasised on Lee's regret for the crime, and he had treated the girl well while confining her at the rented flat, and never harmed her despite his verbal threats and the spontaneous targeting of the girl as a victim. The prosecution did not submit on sentence.

After hearing the representations from the defence, the trial judge, Judicial Commissioner (JC) Chan Seng Onn of the High Court agreed to the defence's position that the death penalty was inappropriate in Lee's case, given that Lee did not mistreat or harm the girl during her time in captivity, Lee's absence of a criminal record, Lee's full cooperation during investigations, and no presence of weapons used during the kidnapping, and the judge also noted that the prosecution did not seek the death sentence in Lee's case. In fact, JC Chan originally wanted to subject Lee to an additional six strokes of the cane besides a life term due to Lee's role as the mastermind, the trauma and distress he caused the girl and her family, and Lee himself having "hatched this detestable criminal scheme to kidnap for ransom a young vulnerable schoolgirl" and recruited others to do the job, but the significant number of mitigating factors highlighted by Pereira in his "persuasive" mitigation plea made the judge reconsider and hence decline to impose caning.

As such, JC Chan spared 33-year-old Vincent Lee Chuan Leong from both the gallows and cane and sentenced Lee to life imprisonment, the minimum punishment for kidnapping by ransom in Singapore. However, Lee appealed against his sentence, though the appeal was presumably rejected or withdrawn after it was filed.

At the time of Lee's sentencing, it was less than three years since the changes to the definition of life imprisonment under the law. Originally, on and before 20 August 1997, life imprisonment means a fixed jail term of 20 years in prison, and with good behaviour, an early release would be granted after serving at least two-thirds of the life sentence (13 years and 4 months). Due to the landmark ruling of Abdul Nasir Amer Hamsah's appeal on 20 August 1997, the interpretation of life imprisonment was changed to a term of incarceration for the rest of the convicted prisoner's natural life instead of 20 years in prison, and the new interpretation would apply to future crimes committed after 20 August 1997. Lee's crime took place in September 1999 and his life sentence was imposed in April 2000, hence his prison term would be equivalent to the remainder of his natural lifespan, with the possibility of parole after twenty years.

=== Trial of Zhou and Shi ===
Accomplices of Vincent Lee Chuan Leong
Zhou Jian Guang, one of the two Chinese men who helped Lee kidnap the 14-year-old schoolgirl

Shi Song Jing, one of the two Chinese men who helped Lee kidnap the 14-year-old schoolgirl

The trial of Zhou Jian Guang and Shi Song Jing took place five days later in a separate courtroom with another judge, Judicial Commissioner (JC) Tay Yong Kwang, hearing the case. Despite initially pleading not guilty, both Zhou and Shi chose to change their plea to guilty to kidnapping the 14-year-old girl for the purposes of extorting the ransom. JC Tay sentenced both Zhou and Shi to life imprisonment on 29 April 2000, the same sentence Lee received. Both men also did not receive caning, based on the facts that the victim was unharmed and treated well while in their captivity, as well as the legal principle of parity where an accomplice who played a more minor role than the mastermind cannot be subjected to a harsher penalty than the mastermind. Lee acted as a witness in the joint trial of the two Chinese men.

Both Zhou and Shi later appealed against the sentence. However, the Court of Appeal dismissed the appeals on 21 August 2000. Chief Justice Yong Pung How highlighted in the judgement that life imprisonment was the most lenient punishment for kidnapping under the laws of Singapore, and he also reminded the pair that they would have been sentenced to hang if any harm had been done to the girl.

== Aftermath ==
=== Lee's imprisonment, release and later life ===
After serving 20 years, ten months and nine days, Lee, then 54 years old, was released on 22 June 2020, after the Life Imprisonment Review Board reviewed his conduct and decided that he be eligible for parole, provided that he never commit another crime outside prison while the parole order remains in force. Lee was reportedly working as a lorry driver as of 2021.

A 2021 YouTube interview was filmed, with the producers speaking to Lee about his case and life after his release. During the interview and documentary, Lee continually expressed his regret for committing the crime, and he also spoke about some details of his life prior to and after his time in prison. Lee also revealed that during his final months of his imprisonment, he was transferred from Changi Prison to the Selarang Park Complex, where it prepared programmes for inmates who served long sentences to learn about the skills required in the outside world (e.g. using a smartphone) and to gain adaptation and integration into the outside world. Several prison officers were also interviewed to speak about Lee's process of rehabilitation. The interview video was eventually set to private and only accessible to selected users.

=== Fate of the victim ===
According to the media in April 2000, ever since the kidnapping, the girl was traumatized by her ordeal, and she mostly stayed indoors, and she also went to a psychiatrist for two or three consultations per week.

In March 2011, 13 years after the kidnapping, the victim's father accepted an interview from the press, and given that the date of his daughter's disappearance happened to be his 44th birthday, the father said it caused him great distress when the kidnapping happened. The father told the paper that his daughter's personality became more emotional and less trusting but the family grew closer after the ordeal.

== Media coverage ==
Kidnapping is extremely rare in Singapore and consequently, Lee's crime attracted significant media attention in the country.

The kidnapping was re-enacted for the Singapore television series Crimewatch and aired as the eighth episode of the show's 2000 season, the year the three kidnappers were sentenced.

== See also ==
- Chua Ser Lien
- Tan Ping Koon
- Kidnapping Act (Singapore)
- Life imprisonment in Singapore
- Capital punishment in Singapore
- List of kidnappings
