= Kiat Lim =

Singaporean businessman

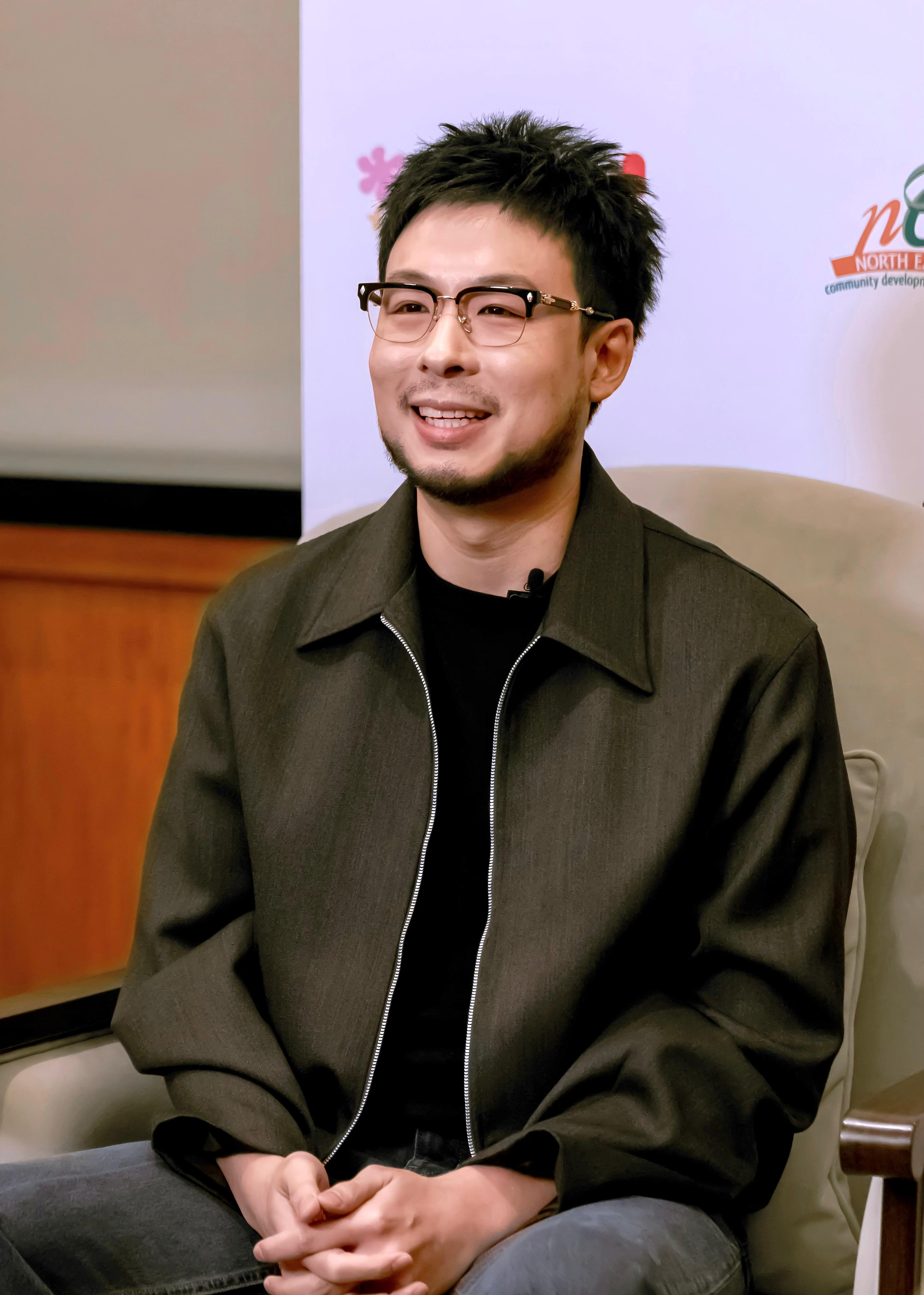
- Lim in 2025
- Born: Lim Wee Kiat; 5 July 1993 (age 33); Singapore
- Education: University of New South Wales
- Occupation: Businessman
- Years active: 2022–present
- Title: President of Valencia
- Children: 2
- Relatives: Peter Lim (father)

Kiat Lim (Chinese: 林伟杰; pinyin: Lín Wěijié; Lim Wee Kiat; born 5 July 1993) is a Singaporean businessman. He is the son of Peter Lim, a Singaporean businessman and owner of Spanish football club Valencia. Kiat Lim has been Valencia's president since 3 March 2025 and has previously held stakes in luxury car manufacturer McLaren Automotive and English football club Salford City.

== Early life and education ==
Kiat Lim studied at Nanyang Primary School, and then ACS International for his International Baccalaureate, before graduating from the University of New South Wales with a bachelor's degree in psychology in 2017. Due to his father's wealth, Lim was among some of the wealthy persons targeted in a 2014 kidnapping in exchange for a S$50 million ransom.

== Career ==
In January 2022, Kiat Lim co-founded ARC, a private social networking app based on non-fungible tokens, with Elroy Cheo of the family behind the edible oil business Mewah International. In February 2022, Kiat Lim launched CO92 DAO, a professional football decentralized autonomous organization, to allow fans to own a stake in the sport.

In July 2022, Lim acquired Singapore-based media company GRVTY Media, which publishes online news platforms Vulcan Post, Millennials of Singapore, and The Daily Ketchup podcast. He was appointed as executive vice-chairman of Thomson Medical, a Singaporean medical group, on 1 September 2022. In 2024, he led Thomson Medical to acquire Vietnam's FV Hospital for about US$381.4 million. He is also currently the chairman of RSP Architects Planners & Engineers, an architecture firm.

On 20 November 2024, Lim committed S$1 million to the Kiat Lim-Shaping Hearts Award, an arts scholarship and bursary programme for children and youth with disabilities.

On 3 March 2025, Lim was appointed as the president of Valencia, which is also owned by his father, Peter Lim. In June 2025, under Lim's leadership, Valencia raised €322 million to fund the completion of its new stadium, the Nou Mestalla. Construction of the stadium had originally begun in 2006, but was halted in 2009 due to financial difficulties after approximately €100 million had been spent on the initial concrete structure. Work on the project resumed in January 2025, following more than a decade of inactivity, with completion targeted for 2027.

In October 2026, Valencia announced an agreement with US investment consortium Pitchwise Holdings to acquire a 42% stake in the club from Meriton Holdings, valuing the club at €1.25 billion. The agreement included a €100 million capital injection, with Meriton retaining majority ownership and Lim continuing as president. The consortium is backed by investors including KKR co-founders George R. Roberts and Henry Kravis, and Penner Sports Group, led by Greg and Carrie Penner. La Liga president Javier Tebas welcomed the agreement, describing it as a significant step in the transition led by Lim, citing the financing secured for the Nou Mestalla stadium and the introduction of international investors.

== Personal life ==
Kiat Lim is married and had a daughter born in 2021 and a son in 2023.
