= Bala Kuppusamy =

Singaporean convicted robber and rapist

- 2008 police mugshot of Bala Kuppusamy
- Born: 14 February 1961 (age 65); Singapore
- Occupations: Dog-catcher (1985; former); Delivery worker (1992; former); Cleaner (2008; former)
- Status: Incarcerated at Changi Prison since 30 June 2008
- Convictions: 1987; Aggravated rape (one count); Theft (two counts); Robbery with hurt (one count); 1993; Aggravated rape (one count); Sodomy (one count); Robbery with hurt (one count); 2009; Aggravated sexual penetration (four counts); Aggravated molestation (two counts); Robbery with hurt (three counts)
- Criminal charges: 1987; Aggravated rape (one count); Theft (two counts); Robbery with hurt (one count); 1993; Aggravated rape (one count); Sodomy (one count); Robbery with hurt (four counts); Molestation (one count); 2009; Aggravated sexual penetration (five counts); Aggravated molestation (three counts); Robbery with hurt (six counts); Robbery (one count)
- Penalty: 1987; 11 years' jail and 28 strokes of the cane 1993; 23 years' jail and 24 strokes of the cane 2009; 42 years' jail and 24 strokes of the cane

Bala Kuppusamy (born 14 February 1961), a Singaporean citizen, is a convicted robber and serial rapist who had committed various offences of rape, robbery and molestation from 1985 to 2008. His first offence of raping and robbing a 19-year-old woman in 1985 led to him being sentenced to 11 years' jail and 28 strokes of the cane, and his second conviction for sexually assaulting two students and four robberies led to him sentenced to 23 years' jail and 24 strokes of the cane.

However, it was after his release in 2008 from his second prison stint, when Bala gained notoreity for committing his third and latest crime spree to date. Merely 41 days after regaining his freedom, Bala attacked seven women and robbed them, and raped four of them. Bala was arrested that same year and, in light of his high risk of re-offending and previous criminal records, Bala, then 48 years old, was sentenced to 42 years in prison and 24 strokes of the cane in March 2009. This was the longest term of incarceration ever imposed for a sex crime until June 2022 when a tutor was sentenced to 45 years in jail but without caning as he was over 50 years old at sentencing.

== Personal life ==
Bala Kuppusamy was born on 14 February 1961 and raised in Singapore. He had one sister in his family. Bala was single with no children in his adulthood.

== 1987 rape conviction and first jail term ==
On 25 November 1985, Bala Kuppusamy had his first run-in with the law when he raped a woman at a factory in Kallang. Bala, who was working as a dog catcher, first approached a 19-year-old production operator of the factory on that night, claiming that her boyfriend was engaged to a girl he knew, and asked her to call her boyfriend to come to that factory. However, the woman's boyfriend did not show up, and afterwards, Bala brought the 19-year-old girl into the men's toilet, where he slapped her (resulting in a mouth injury) and raped her. Bala was arrested and the victim identified him through an identification parade on 9 January 1986. Aside from this, Bala had committed robbery and theft prior to his arrest. The preliminary hearing of Bala's case took place in July 1986 before it was transferred to the High Court for trial hearing.

On 2 November 1987, after Bala pleaded guilty to one count of aggravated rape, Judicial Commissioner Chan Sek Keong sentenced 26-year-old Bala to nine years' imprisonment and 12 strokes of the cane. Just 18 days later, Bala was found guilty of robbery with hurt and two theft charges in a separate court hearing, and he had two more years added to his sentence, plus another 16 strokes of the cane, which amounted to 11 years' imprisonment and 28 strokes of the cane. Although the legal maximum number of cane strokes allowed is 24, it was not restricted for an offender in Singapore to receive more than 24 cane strokes in two or more separate trials for whichever offences punishable by caning.

After completing two-thirds of his sentence (equivalent to seven years and four months) with good behaviour, Bala was released on parole on 8 September 1992.

== 1993 rape conviction and second jail term ==
45 days after he was released, Bala Kuppusamy re-offended and attacked four women at or near Marymount Flyover within the last week of October 1992. He assaulted and robbed these four women, and out of these four women, two were sexually assaulted by Bala. The first robbery took place on 23 October 1992, when he robbed a 13-year-old girl and molested her; the second and third robberies took place on the same night of 27 October, when Bala robbed two women within 15 minutes at two different locations, getting away with a loot of S$40 and jewellery worth S$1,815. On the night of 30 October, Bala approached a 20-year-old student, demanding that she hand over her valuables. Even after the fourth victim gave him S$100, Bala dragged her to the bushes, assaulting her before he raped and sodomized the girl, from whom he took another S$10.

Two days after his fourth crime, Bala was arrested on 1 November 1992 for these seven offences against the four victims, and he was identified by the 20-year-old student through a police identification parade. The crime also raised residents' concern about the security around the secluded roads of Braddell during night time, and many hoped that the safety of the residents, especially their female family members, could be better protected by reducing the incidences of crimes in the area. The authorities also stated that residents should be more vigilant as a part to help prevent crime from happening.

On 16 July 1993, the trial judge, Justice Punch Coomaraswamy of the High Court, sentenced 32-year-old Bala to 18 years' imprisonment and 12 strokes of the cane for aggravated rape, five years (consecutive) for sodomy and another six years (concurrent) with 12 strokes of the cane for robbery with hurt, which amounted to a total of 23 years in jail with 24 strokes of the cane. Before sentencing, Justice Coomaraswamy admonished the accused for not learning his lesson from his first stint in prison, which ended just seven weeks before Bala committed this second string of offences against four innocent females, and he added that Bala deserved no sympathy.

After completing two-thirds of his sentence (equivalent to 15 years and four months) with good behaviour, Bala was released on parole on 17 March 2008.

== Third crime spree and arrest ==
41 days after his release from his second prison sentence, Bala Kuppusamy once again committed sexual assault and robbery and other offences. This spate of offences lasted from 27 April 2008 to 10 June 2008, and was his most severe crime spree to date. In total, seven victims aged between 16 and 34 were targeted by Bala, who committed these offences during night time at secluded areas all over Singapore.

On the night of 27 April 2008, at Bukit Timah, a 34-year-old Myanmar maid was stalked by Bala. Although she noticed him and tried to escape, Bala caught and assaulted her before stealing S$400 from the woman. He then escaped to his workplace, a fast food restaurant in Raffles City (where Bala worked as a cleaner), to report for work as usual.

On the night of 30 April 2008, a 20-year-old polytechnic student, who came from China, was walking along Bartley Road on her way to give tuition to a student living in that area. Bala targeted her by ambushing her from behind, and forced her to hand over S$200 and her phone. The second victim refused to follow Bala into the nearby woods, so he assaulted the woman before he fled, reporting for work as per usual.

On the night of 28 May 2008, along Upper Serangoon Road, an 18-year-old secondary school student, who was a China-born Singapore permanent resident, was heading to Woodleigh MRT station when she was approached by Bala, who pretended to ask her for directions. Afterwards, he threatened the girl to hand over her phone and money, and assaulted her. After he got the phone and S$30 in cash, Bala took the girl to the back of the station where he sexually assaulted her. After doing so, he fled to his workplace to report for work as usual.

On the night of 1 June 2008, Bala approached a 16-year-old Singaporean student as she was walking along Marymount Road, under the pretence of asking for directions to Braddell Road. The 16-year-old schoolgirl kindly agreed to lead him, but after walking past a forested area, Bala dragged the girl to the bushes, where he forced the girl to undress before he sexually assaulted her.

Three other incidents also happened during that period, one on 26 May 2008, one on 9 June 2008, and a third on 10 June 2008. Bala committed robbery with hurt against his fifth victim (aged 28), and another case of robbery with hurt against his sixth victim (aged 19). He also robbed and sexually assaulted his seventh victim, who was 26 years old.

On 30 June 2008, merely 20 days after he committed his seventh robbery, the police arrested Bala, who was then 47 years old, and he was charged with a total of 15 counts, including sexual penetration, robbery with hurt and aggravated molestation. The victims also positively identified Bala as the robber and sex offender who attacked them.

== 2009 trial and third jail term ==
On 3 March 2009, 48-year-old Bala Kuppusamy stood trial at the High Court for nine counts of sexual penetration, molestation and robbery with hurt, while the remaining six charges were temporarily on hold during the trial. Bala, who was unrepresented, pleaded guilty to all charges and also agreed to have the other six charges taken into consideration during sentencing. He submitted a mitigation plea, pleading for leniency, and promised to never commit another crime again for the rest of his life.

However, the trial prosecutor Francis Ng argued before the trial judge, Justice Tay Yong Kwang, that Bala was "a inveterate predator" who posed as a "clear and present danger to society" and referred to his criminal records, which consisted of mostly violent offences like robbery and sex crimes, and argued that Bala resorted to violence and threats in all his crimes against the seven victims to achieve his goals, and even committed sexual assaults on a majority of his victims. Ng also brought the court's attention to the trauma of the victims who were robbed, assaulted and raped by Bala, and cited the high risk of re-offending on Bala's part, and therefore sought a jail term ranging between 40 and 45 years in jail for Bala (as well as caning).

In his verdict on sentence, Justice Tay condemned Bala as a "merciless, marauding monster" who had no qualms about resorting to violence when targeting defenceless young women, and stated that Bala had a strong propensity to re-offend based on the fact that he committed strings of aggravated robberies and sexual offences merely weeks after he was released for both the second and third time respectively, showing he had the inability to distance himself from criminality in spite of the long terms of incarceration and high number of cane strokes he received, and he called Bala's criminal history "appalling".

Justice Tay stated that for his frequent attacks on women throughout the past few decades, Bala himself was indeed a menace to society and he was "not fit to live freely in society", and he said that it would be too lenient to sentence Bala to serve even the maximum period of 20 years' preventive detention, a special type of imprisonment without the possibility of parole for recalcitrant criminals. Hence, he agreed with the prosecution's submission to keep Bala behind bars as long as possible for the protection of society. He also stated that Bala's promise to not commit any crime again till his death was "extremely hollow" in view of the aggravating factors of his case and his long criminal history.

As such, Justice Tay sentenced Bala to a total of 42 years in prison, and also ordered Bala to receive the maximum of 24 strokes of the cane, marking the third time Bala would receive the legal maximum of cane strokes permitted under the law. Bala's sentence was backdated to the date of his arrest on 30 June 2008.

== Aftermath of third conviction ==
In the aftermath of his trial in 2009, Bala filed an appeal against his 42-year sentence, but after a few weeks, Bala decided to waive his right to appeal and informed the court that he would withdraw his appeal, and his main reason was due to his fear of having the jail term raised as a possible consequence. Bala is currently behind bars serving his 42-year jail term since 30 June 2008, with the possibility of parole in 2036 after completing two-thirds of his latest sentence (equivalent to 28 years).

Bala's sister was interviewed a week after her brother was sentenced a third time for rape and robbery. Expressing her sadness at her brother's imprisonment, Bala's sister, who only gave her name as Madam Raja, told the press that when her brother was released the previous year, she wanted to introduce him to a 43-year-old woman, who was an acquaintance of her friend, with the hope that her brother could get married and that having a wife would allow him to change his ways and work towards reforming himself. However, Bala rejected his sister's offer without even meeting the friend, and afterwards, he went on to commit his latest crimes just 41 days after his release. "Madam Raja" was reportedly the only family member of Bala to visit him during his previous and current stints in prison.

Bala's sentence of 42 years' imprisonment was one of the longest jail terms which the courts handed down in cases of rape or any other sexual offences in the past few decades. Bala's sentence was cited as the longest jail term received by a sex offender when in May 2014, 44-year-old serial rapist Azuar Ahamad, who spiked the drinks of his victims before raping them, was sentenced to 37 1/2 years' imprisonment and 24 strokes of the cane, for which the jail term was slightly shorter when compared to Bala's.

The latest crime spree perpetuated by Bala also prompted experts and prison authorities to review and discuss the procedure of reforming the convicted sex offenders in prison to ensure they never re-offend after their release from prison. It was noted that the prison statistics showed that the probability of low-risk sex offenders to re-offend was only 6.9% within two years of release, although many noted that the case of Bala highlighted the need for more effective measures to reform sex criminals and they also mentioned that there could be many other factors behind why Bala re-offended a short time after his release, like his inclination towards rehabilitation and rate of access to resources available to assist in his rehabilitation and re-integration into society. Bala's 34-year-old nephew noted that his uncle often derided female passers-by for their dress and claimed they dressed provocatively to seduce him. He had also heard Bala often mentioning his feeling that it was easy to hit women and steal from them, and the pleasure doing so brought him. Nevertheless, his behaviour did not sufficiently make Bala's family feel alarmed as they thought he was merely struggling with adapting to life outside prison.

Also, lawyers also stated that there was a need to reform the system of releasing an offender on parole as the prisoner's eligibility to be released early should also be assessed based on the level of re-offending in his case.

In the aftermath of Bala's third conviction and sentence, Singaporean crime show Crimewatch re-adapted the 2008 rape and robbery cases committed by Bala and aired it on television in September 2009.

== See also ==
- Yap Weng Wah
- Peh Thian Hui case
- Kelvin Lim Hock Hin
- Caning in Singapore
- List of major crimes in Singapore
