= Chan Seng Onn =

Singaporean judge

Chan Seng Onn PJG PBS

Senior Judge of the High Court of Singapore
- Incumbent
- Assumed office 5 January 2022

Judge of the High Court of Singapore
- In office 2 July 2007 – 3 January 2022

Solicitor-General of Singapore
- In office 2001–2007

Personal details
- Born: 4 January 1954 (age 72) Colony of Singapore

Chinese name
- Traditional Chinese: 陳成安
- Simplified Chinese: 陈成安
- Hanyu Pinyin: Chén Chéngān
- IPA: [ʈʂʰə̌n.ʈʂʰə̌ŋ.án]

Chan Seng Onn PJG PBS is a Singaporean judge who presently serves as a Senior Judge of the High Court of Singapore. Formerly a prosecutor, Chan had previously served as a High Court judge from 2007 to 2022.

== Early life and education ==
Chan Seng Onn was born in Singapore on 4 January 1954 as the youngest of three children, with two sisters. His mother was a housewife and his father worked as a sewage pump attendant. He studied at St Anthony's Boys' School and then St Joseph's Institution (SJI) where he did his GCE O-Level and A-Level exams. He was a top student alongside future politicians Teo Chee Hean and George Yeo at SJI.

As a President's and Colombo Plan scholar, he graduated with a bachelor's degree in engineering from University College London in 1976. He received a master's degree in industrial engineering from National University of Singapore (NUS) in 1981, and a Diploma in Business Administration from NUS. He received his Bachelor of Laws from NUS in 1986 and Master of Laws from University of Cambridge in 1987.

== Legal career ==
=== Prosecutor ===
In 1987, he joined the Singapore Legal Service as State Counsel and Deputy Public Prosecutor in the Attorney-General's Chambers (AGC). He was appointed Senior Assistant Registrar to the Supreme Court in 1991. In 1994, he returned to AGC in the role of Senior State Counsel.

During his tenure as a prosecutor, one of the cases prosecuted by Chan was that of Ng Theng Shuang, one of the two Malaysian armed robbers involved in the South Bridge Road shootout after their failed goldsmith robbery attempt. Ng managed to escape to Malaysia, where he was caught a year later, while the accomplice Lee Kok Chin was killed by Cisco officer Karamjit Singh, who was shot twice in his leg by Ng. Ng was brought to trial in Singapore's High Court for illegally discharging a firearm, and Chan successfully sought a guilty verdict and death sentence for Ng due to the evidence of Ng's fingerprints at the scene of crime and testimony of witnesses who knew about Ng's involvement in the crime, which refuted Ng's claims of an alibi. Ng lost his appeal against the death sentence and he was hanged on 14 July 1995

=== Tenure as judicial commissioner ===
On 15 October 1997, he was appointed Judicial Commissioner.

In August 1998, as Judicial Commissioner, Chan was the presiding judge of the trial of Too Yin Sheong, one of the three Malaysians accused of the brutal robbery-murder of Lee Kok Cheong, an associate professor of National University of Singapore, in December 1993. Too, who was arrested four years after the murder, stated he never strangled the professor and testified that it was one of the accomplices who did the killing, but Chan found that Too was a "cold-blooded" murderer who never stepped in to stop his accomplice from strangling the victim to death, and even remorselessly stole Lee's ATM card to make unauthorized withdrawals of money to spend on shopping for himself and his accomplices, and found that he acted in furtherance of the common intention of the trio to commit robbery, and in turn, to silence Lee for the sake of avoid leaving witnesses behind. Hence, Chan found Too guilty of murdering Lee, and sentenced him to death on 28 August 1998. Too was hanged on 30 April 1999 after his appeal failed. As for Too's accomplices, one of them (Ng Chek Siong) was caught in May 1998 and sentenced three months later to eight years' jail with ten strokes of the cane, while the other accomplice (Lee Chez Kee), whom Too claimed was the main offender responsible for the murder, was arrested in February 2006 and likewise executed for murder.

In April 2000, Chan heard the case of 33-year-old Vincent Lee Chuan Leong, one of the three kidnappers and mastermind of the abduction of a 14-year-old girl for ransom in September 1999. Chan, in his judgement, noted Lee have no criminal records, and during the course of the kidnapping, he did not harm the girl and treated her well save for the trauma the victim gone through, and thus he decided that the death penalty was inappropriate, and instead sentenced Lee to life imprisonment. Subsequently, the other two kidnappers Shi Song Jing and Zhou Jian Guang, who were illegal immigrants from China, were also sentenced to life in prison by another judge Tay Yong Kwang during a separate trial.

=== Tenure as Solicitor-General and judge ===
In June 2001, Chan returned to AGC as Solicitor-General. In that same year, he was appointed Senior Counsel. On 2 July 2007, he was sworn in as a High Court judge by President S. R. Nathan at the Istana.

One of the cases which Chan presided as High Court judge was the 2008 Yishun triple murders, in which he sentenced 46-year-old Wang Zhijian to death in 2012 for the murder of one of the three victims while finding him guilty of culpable homicide for killing the two other victims. Chan's decision to pass the death sentence was upheld by the Court of Appeal of Singapore in 2014 when Wang tried to appeal the verdict (which was rejected), although the appellate court also amended the double culpable homicide convictions to murder based on the fact that Wang was not mentally unsound when he killed the other two victims.

Chan was also the judge who sentenced Ipoh-born Malaysian Nagaenthran K. Dharmalingam to death after finding him guilty of drug trafficking. Nagaenthran was originally set to be hanged on 10 November 2021 after serving 11 years on death row. However, a day before his scheduled hanging, Nagaenthran was discovered to be infected with COVID-19 and thus his execution was suspended, with the courts allowing him time to recover and Nagaenthran himself had also appealed to reduce his sentence. The appeal was dismissed on 29 March 2022, and he was executed on 27 April 2022.

Chan was also the presiding judge during the trial of Azuar Ahamad, a logistics executive who was charged with sexually assaulting 22 women after befriending them and drugging them. Agreeing with the prosecutors’ description of Azuar as “Singapore’s worst serial rapist”, Chan admonished Azuar for his remorseless behavior and pointing out that the offender had committed the sexual crimes with a high level of premeditation, and also cited Azuar having said numerous lies to distance himself from the fact that he drugged the women and took advantage of them. Labelling Azuar as a menace to society and noting his high possibility to reoffend, Chan sentenced 44-year-old Azuar to a 37 1/2 years’ imprisonment and 24 strokes of the cane.

== Awards and decorations ==
- Meritorious Service Medal, in 2023.
- Long Service Medal, in 2002.
