= Tan Ping Koon =

Singaporean kidnapper and former businessman

- Police mugshot of Tan in 2003
- Born: c. 1968; Singapore
- Occupation: Director of transportation company (former)
- Status: Released on parole in 2023
- Criminal charge: Kidnapping by ransom
- Penalty: Life imprisonment and three strokes of the cane

Tan Ping Koon (陈平坤 Chén Píngkūn; born 1968) is a Singaporean man who, together with Chua Ser Lien, was charged for the kidnapping of a seven-year-old girl for ransom during Christmas Day of 2003. Tan, who was the owner and manager of a transportation company, had several financial troubles and thus it led to both Tan and Chua to decide to kidnap a child of a wealthy businessman for ransom. The men also demanded a ransom of S$1 million before settling on the final sum of S$70,000 through negotiations. Two days after the crime, both Chua and Tan were arrested and brought to trial for kidnapping for ransom, and after they pleaded guilty to committing the crime, both men were each sentenced to life at Changi Prison and three strokes of the cane by High Court judge Tay Yong Kwang on 9 September 2004. In 2023, Tan was released on parole after serving 19 years in prison.

== Personal life ==
Born in 1968, Tan Ping Koon had at least one sibling - a younger sister - in his family. He later established a transportation company and became its transport manager. He later married, and had one daughter who was born in 1994 or 1995.

By July 2003, Tan's wife separated from him, and she left both Tan and their daughter, who continued staying at her father's Tampines flat. The reason for her separation was due to her husband's gambling addiction, and it caused him to rake up huge debts. Despite selling off the flat to pay his debts, Tan remained incorrigible and persisted in his gambling habits, which caused his wife to live separately from him. By December 2003, Tan had a debt totalling up to S$500,000, and he even ran off to Malaysia at one point to hide from loan sharks, but he returned for fear of leaving his daughter alone without care or safety in Singapore. Tan's company was also plunged into a precarious financial situation as well.

== Criminal conduct ==
In early December 2003, Tan Ping Koon, then 35 years old, met up with his friend Chua Ser Lien (whom he knew for seven years) to talk about his financial troubles. Like Tan, Chua, then a 42-year-old cleaning company owner married with two sons, was also heavily in debt, as he owed about S$600,000 to his creditors. Both men, after some talk, decided that in order to solve their debts, they had to kidnap someone for ransom. They researched on potential targets from the list of businesses they obtained, and selected one of the companies' managing director, who was a former business partner of Chua's childhood friend and thought of kidnapping one of the director's children to extort a S$2 million ransom from him. The men initially thought of trafficking drugs but decided to abort the plan in favour of kidnapping, and they also hoped that if they won lottery, they would call off the kidnap plan, but they did not.

After a week of planning, on 25 December 2003, coincidentally Christmas Day, Tan and Chua drove their getaway car (with false license plate numbers) to the man's home at Yio Chu Kang to execute their kidnap plan. As the house gates were still open, and the people at the house were busy preparing for a Christmas party and buffet dinner, Chua decided to enter the house without anyone knowing, and wore a mask to disguise himself. He managed to abduct one of the director's children, a seven-year-old girl, from the living room and quickly ran off to the car with the girl. Tan, who was the driver, drove off upon Chua entering their vehicle. However, the abduction was witnessed by the girl's brothers and a catering assistant, who took down the license plate number and asked her husband to follow the car. After the men drove for thirty minutes, they spotted the husband tailing them from behind, and thus released the girl at the side of the road in Tampines. The girl, who was not harmed or gagged, was taken back home, and the mother contacted the police.

Despite their failure, Tan and Chua decided to contact the girl's father the next day, asking for a ransom of S$1 million. They threatened to endanger the safety of the father and the girl if he did not pay up on time. The father, who reported the matter to the police, decided to play along with the men's request (as instructed by the police) and he later negotiated with the men to pay a ransom of S$70,000. On 27 December 2003, two days after the kidnapping, the men eventually received the ransom at their pick-up point at Pan Island Expressway, and they were arrested shortly after at Tampines by the police, who tailed them from the pick-up point and monitored their movements all the while.

After their arrests, Tan and Chua were charged with kidnapping for ransom, a crime which is punishable by death or life imprisonment with/without caning.

== Court proceedings and aftermath ==
=== Trial and guilty plea ===
On 6 September 2004, 35-year-old Tan Ping Koon and 42-year-old Chua Ser Lien stood trial at the High Court for the kidnapping of the seven-year-old girl. In his trial, Tan was represented by Subhas Anandan, then the most famous criminal lawyer in Singapore, who was known for representing notorious criminals like Anthony Ler (who manipulated a 15-year-old student to murder his wife) in several high-profile cases. Chua, on the other hand, was represented by another lawyer named Lee Teck Leng in both his and Tan's joint trial. Both men initially submitted there was no case to answer since during the abduction of the child, they did not demand for ransom despite having the intention to. After a discussion with their lawyers, both Tan and Chua changed their minds and decided to plead guilty.

In his submissions, Anandan argued that Tan should not be sentenced to death (the maximum punishment for kidnapping), and he instead submitted that Tan should be given a life sentence for his crime. He argued that both his client and Chua should be regarded as having pleaded guilty at the earliest opportunity as they did not do so on the first day of trial only because of the then unresolved legal issue, and their decision to plead guilty had spared the girl the need to recount her traumatic experience on the stand.

Anandan also added that the kidnapping was committed by Tan out of desperation to pay his debts and recounted his personal background, and submitted the psychiatrist Dr Gwee Kok Peng's diagnosis report (dated March 2004) to highlight Tan's psychiatric state. While in remand, Dr Gwee found that at the time of the offence, Tan had depression, epilepsy and low IQ, and these were severe enough to impair his judgement and led to more difficulty on Tan's part to manage his stressors, and should Tan receive proper care and treatment while in prison, he would recover. In Dr Gwee's words, he made a conclusion on Tan's psychiatric state, "Given his low intelligence, poor verbal reasoning, planning difficulties and concrete thinking, he had difficulty coping with the multiple stressors at the time. Adding that to the hopelessness aggravated by his depression, he tended to resort to desperate, short-sighted measures." From this, Anandan sought mercy for Tan and asked that he should not receive caning due to the victim's lack of injury and the relatively short period of time the girl was held hostage.

Chua's defence counsel also took a similar defence strategy to plead to the trial court to spare Chua from the death penalty on account of his severe bipolar disorder symptoms and various extenuating circumstances in his case.

=== Sentence and imprisonment ===
On 9 September 2004, the trial judge Tay Yong Kwang of the High Court sentenced both Tan and Chua to life imprisonment and three strokes of the cane each. Justice Tay accepted the men's psychiatric reports and expressed sympathy for their financial troubles, but he nonetheless criticized the men for targeting a child and stated that both defendants, who were parents themselves, should understand more than anyone the grief of any parent whose child goes missing.

Justice Tay also pointed out that while the men did release the girl shortly after the abduction, they did it not out of a change of heart but due to their "sheer hard luck", and they tried to extort money from the family under threats of their safety despite the failure. He also found there was meticulous planning made by both men (especially Chua, the "more brainy one" in Justice Tay's words) to commit the crime since they discussed it for over a week and look for the right timing to strike.

Still, Justice Tay refrained from imposing the death sentence given both defendants' respective mental disorders and the lack of weapons and no harm was done to the girl during the kidnapping, and thus decided that it was sufficient to punish the men with life terms and caning of three strokes to "convey the message that kidnapping, especially of vulnerable victims, is likely to be visited with painful consequences." The passers-by who helped the girl and the police were all commended for their efforts to help the girl and ensuring the kidnappers be caught within a short period of time.

Before they were led away from the courtroom, Tan was allowed to speak to his daughter and younger sister, and he cried as he conversed with the two of them, while Chua, who had only one relative appearing in court, remained silent and calm during and after sentencing. When she was interviewed, Tan's estranged wife commented that if only her husband did not gamble, he would not have become heavily in debt and ended up having to serve his time in jail for the rest of his life.

Tan, whose sentence was backdated to the date of his capture (27 December 2003), is currently serving his sentence at Changi Prison. If he served with good behaviour, it is possible that Tan, after serving at least twenty years of his sentence, can be released on parole should he reached the conditions for eligibility.

During his time of imprisonment, Tan's case was re-adapted by Singaporean crime show Singaporean crime show Crimewatch, airing as the ninth episode of the show's annual season in 2004 (the year he was sentenced). Also, during the 17th year mark of Tan's sentence, Chua died at the age of 58 due to suicide in July 2020, leaving Tan the only one of the kidnappers who remained alive while in prison; it was not known how Tan, then 51 or 52 years old, reacted to the death of his old friend.

== See also ==
- Chua Ser Lien
- Vincent Lee Chuan Leong
- Caning in Singapore
- Life imprisonment in Singapore
- Capital punishment in Singapore
- List of kidnappings
