= Chua Ser Lien =

Singaporean and convicted kidnapper

- Police mugshot of Chua in 2003
- Born: c. 1961; Singapore
- Died: 8 July 2020 (aged 58); Changi General Hospital, Singapore
- Occupation: Director of cleaning company (former)
- Status: Died by suicide in prison
- Criminal charge: Kidnapping by ransom
- Penalty: Life imprisonment and three strokes of the cane

Chua Ser Lien (蔡思连 Caì Sīlián; c. 1961 – 8 July 2020) was a Singaporean who, together with his accomplice Tan Ping Koon, kidnapped a seven-year-old girl during Christmas Day of 2003. The abduction was brief and witnessed by several people, one of whom gave chase to the pair. Both Chua and Tan, then aged 42 and 35 respectively, realised they were followed and released the girl at Tampines. However, the two kidnappers called the girl's father the following day and demanded S$1 million from him or they would hurt her family. The sum of S$70,000 was eventually agreed and paid to them before both their arrests on 27 December 2003.

After they both stood trial in September 2004 and pled guilty, both Tan and Chua were each sentenced to life imprisonment and three strokes of the cane. In July 2020, after 17 years behind bars, Chua, who had bipolar disorder, attempted suicide and fell off the railing during yard time at Changi Prison (where he served his sentence), and he died on the same day of his fall.

== Early life ==
Born in Singapore in 1961, Chua Ser Lien was the third child in his family.

After he finished his schooling and reached adulthood, Chua later established a cleaning company and became the director of the company itself. He married a woman in 1985, and together, the couple had two sons, who were born in 1998 and 1999 respectively; the younger son was diagnosed with autism spectrum disorder. Chua was also the sole breadwinner of his family.

Chua had experienced a series of psychiatric problems during adulthood. He was first diagnosed in May 2001 to have schizoaffective disorder, a severe form of mental illness. During that time, Chua was observed to be talkative and irrelevant in his speech, had delusions of grandeur and paranoia and kept hearing hallucinatory voices. According to the psychiatrist, Chua "was illogical, his judgment was severely impaired and he was out of touch with reality." He was hospitalised in Adam Road Hospital between 27 May and 16 June 2001 for treatment. While Chua recovered and was mentally stable from June 2001 to May 2002, he began feeling depressed since July 2002, and he had bouts of sleeplessness and mood swings. Chua's wife also gradually took notice of her husband's strange behaviours (caused by Chua's psychiatric condition), such as his sudden declaration to donate a million dollars during a meeting at Nanyang Technological University, Chua changing cars thrice and purchasing six expensive watches at one go, and his insistence that the kitchen was hell and the living room was heaven. She later referred her husband to a psychiatrist after he locked himself in his room on one occasion with two pieces of bread. Chua was eventually diagnosed with bipolar disorder, and was prescribed with anti-psychotic medication to treat his disorder.

== 2003 Yio Chu Kang abduction case ==
=== Planning of abduction plot ===
By late 2003, Chua Ser Lien's cleaning company had experienced several monetary problems, and Chua also accumulated a gambling debt of around S$600,000. In early December 2003, 42-year-old Chua, who was stressed by his financial problems, met up with his 35-year-old friend Tan Ping Koon (陈平坤 Chén Píngkūn), who was a self-employed transport manager to talk about his debts. Similarly, at that time, Tan himself was also troubled by his precarious financial situation and debts amounting to half a million dollars, and his wife had left him and his nine-year-old daughter to live in separation. Prior to this, Tan and Chua knew each other for seven years as they both lived in the same public housing neighbourhood at Tampines.

As both men spoke about their own financial debts, they both discuss ways to help discharge their debts. At first, the men thought of drug trafficking but were too afraid of taking part in it due to low returns and risks of the death penalty. Chua later suggested that they kidnap a person for a ransom of $2 million. They both gathered information to look for possible targets, and after identifying two companies as their best options, Chua decided to choose one of the companies, as he heard from a friend that this particular company's managing director had a huge income, for which it was more than sufficient to fork a ransom of $2 million from him. Chua and Tan decided that they would target one of the director's children for abduction. In fact, they planned to call the kidnapping off if they won the weekly lottery based on two numbers they selected as their false registration plates for their getaway car, but they did not.

=== Child abduction and ransom ===
On 25 December 2003, coincidentally Christmas Day, after a week of planning and scouting the address, both Chua and Tan put their plan into action, driving Chua's white car with false registration numbers to the director's bungalow house at Yio Chu Kang. It was discussed that Chua would abduct the child while Tan be the driver, since Tan was fatter in comparison to Chua's body size and may not be fast enough for movement; they also thought of confining the child inside Tan's flat for a period of time until the ransom was paid. The men, upon seeing that the gates were open and the director's three children were in the living room watching television, the men made their move.

Chua, who covered his face with a mask, alighted the car, and he swiftly entered the house, where the family was busy preparing for a party to celebrate Christmas. Chua entered the living room, and he grabbed one of the children - a seven-year-old girl who was born on 26 August 1996 - who was the closest to him. The girl's two brothers, who were playing electronic games, happened to witness the abduction of their sister and quickly informed their mother, who called the police. At the meantime, Chua entered the car with the girl, and as Tan drove the car, Chua repeatedly assured the girl that she was safe and he would not harm her, and accepted her requests to not be tied, gagged or blindfolded.

However, Chua and Tan were being caught in the act by two catering assistants, one of whom took down the license plate number. The sighting of the girl's abduction was relayed to one of the two catering assistants' husband and when he spotted the getaway car, he decided to trail after them in his own vehicle. The two kidnappers, having realized they were being tailed, decided to abort their original kidnapping plan and drop the girl off at Tampines, merely thirty minutes after they abducted the girl, who was subsequently brought back home by the man who chased the duo's van.

Despite aborting their plan, Chua and Tan came up with a plan B, which was to contact the girl's father the next day, demanding the father to pay up a ransom of S$1 million in exchange for the safety of the family; they also pretended that they had a mastermind who ordered them to abduct the girl and ask for ransom. The father reported the matter to the police, who came up with the plan to play along with the kidnappers' requests and to apprehend them right after the ransom payment. After a few phone conversations (under police supervision), it was agreed that the father would pay the duo a ransom of S$70,000 and they would drop off the ransom at an SOS phone booth on the Pan Island Expressway. After the drop-off, Chua collected the bag containing the money, and left with Tan. Without both men noticing, they were being watched by the police officers, who tailed them as the men left the place for Tampines.

=== Arrest ===
The police tailed both Chua and Tan, who both collected the ransom at the pick-up point, and not knowing that they were followed, the men went to Tampines to have lunch at a coffee shop. They ate their meal and went back to the car, where they were ambushed and arrested by the police officers for kidnapping the girl two days earlier and extorting ransom from the girl's father. Both men were charged in court with kidnapping for ransom on 29 December 2003; if found guilty of such a crime, Chua and Tan faced either life imprisonment or the death penalty.

The occurrence of the 2003 Christmas kidnapping was not the only kidnap case that happened in the year 2003 itself. Just four months earlier, a 45-year-old jobless Singaporean named Selvaraju Satippan abducted two women - MediaCorp journalist Nina Elizabeth Varghese and her maid - for ransom, and even tried to kill the hostages. Selvaraju was arrested, charged and sentenced to life imprisonment and 24 strokes of the cane for abduction, attempted murder, causing hurt and arson.

== Abduction trial ==
=== Pleas of guilt and submissions ===
On 6 September 2004, Chua Ser Lien and Tan Ping Koon stood trial at the High Court for the abduction of the seven-year-old girl and extortion. Although both men initially argued there was no case to answer since the demand for ransom did not take place after the girl's abduction, both Tan and Chua eventually changed their minds and plead guilty to kidnapping the girl for ransom.

The men's respective lawyers Lee Teck Leng (Chua's lawyer) and Subhas Anandan (Tan's lawyer) argued that the death penalty was inappropriate for their two clients. In the case of Chua, Lee argued that Chua was a first offender and he committed the crime due to financial difficulties faced by his cleaning firm, and during the 30-minute long abduction, Chua and Tan did not harm the girl or tie her up, and Chua also accepted the girl's plea to not be gagged, and Chua repeatedly assured the girl that he and Tan would not hurt her and she would be alright. Her release before the demand for ransom also spared the girl and her family from the trauma of having to negotiate her release and paying the ransom.

Not only did Lee highlighted Chua's remorse and full cooperation with the police, Lee also submitted psychiatric reports to show that Chua's severe psychiatric issues had significant influence over his mental faculties and ability to think, which severely impaired his mental responsibility and from the words of the psychiatrist Dr Francis Ngui (who assessed Chua), Chua would not have committed the crime had he not been suffering from his mental disorders. Hence, the trial court was urged to temper justice with mercy and show leniency to Chua in terms of his sentence. Similarly for Tan, his lawyer Anandan highlighted about Tan's psychiatric problems and low IQ in order to persuade the trial judge to not subject Tan to a harsh punishment on account of the same mitigating factors laid out by Chua's lawyer. The prosecution did not make submissions on sentence.

=== Life imprisonment verdict ===
On 9 September 2004, 42-year-old Chua Ser Lian was sentenced to life imprisonment and three strokes of the cane. 35-year-old Tan Ping Koon also received the same sentence of life with caning (three strokes) for the kidnapping as well. Despite his sympathy towards the men for their personal difficulties, Justice Tay Yong Kwang of the High Court nonetheless reprimanded Chua and Tan for targeting a young child and stated that both men, who were fathers themselves, should know better than anyone the anguish of any parent whose child goes missing. Justice Tay also pointed out that while the men did release the girl shortly after the abduction, they did it not out of a change of heart but due to their "sheer hard luck", and they tried to extort money from the family under threats of their safety despite the failure. The judge inferred that the men had planned the kidnapping for a week and it demonstrated the meticulous planning and premeditation on the part of both men (especially Chua) since "their moves were opportunistic, targeting easy victims like children and intruding into a home at a time when preparations for a party were under way and when strangers would not be immediately noticed."

In view of the mitigating factors, the psychiatric conditions of the men and the lack of harm to the girl, as well as absence of weapons used during the kidnapping, Justice Tay concluded that the death penalty was inappropriate, and thus imposed the minimum sentences of life imprisonment on both Chua and Tan. Justice Tay also added three strokes of the cane to each of the men's respective sentences, so as to, in Justice Tay's words, "convey the message that kidnapping, especially of vulnerable victims, is likely to be visited with painful consequences." Before ending off the verdict, the judge praised the kindness of the passers-by for being alert and helping the girl without hesitation, and their actions were crucial to saving the girl and enabling the police to gain first-hand information of the kidnappers to ensure both of them be brought to justice. He also commended the police for having swiftly arrested the kidnappers and enabled the conclusion of the investigations within a short time with their meticulous efforts and hard work.

Before they were led away to Changi Prison to serve their sentences, Tan was allowed to speak to his daughter and younger sister, while Chua, who had only one relative attending the hearing, remained silent and calm during and after the delivery of the verdict. When she was interviewed, Tan's estranged wife commented that had her husband not been addicted to gambling in the first place, he would not have ended up getting riddled with huge debts and spending his whole life in prison.

In the aftermath of Chua's kidnapping trial, the seven-year-old girl's abduction case was dramatized in the Singaporean crime show Crimewatch, airing as the ninth episode of the show's annual season in 2004.

== Imprisonment and death ==
=== Prison life and psychiatric state ===
After his sentencing in 2004, Chua was transferred to the Cluster A of Changi Prison, where he began serving his life sentence with effect from the date of his capture on 27 December 2003. In 2005, a year after Chua's conviction and sentencing, Chua's wife divorced him in order to apply for a rental flat to provide a place for her sons and herself to move into. Still, Chua's ex-wife still loved him and considered Chua as her husband, and he continued to receive regular visits from his sons and ex-wife. Chua also continually received medical treatment for his psychiatric condition.

In 2018, Chua's bipolar disorder condition deteriorated and in view of his worsening symptoms, Chua was transferred to the psychiatric housing unit of Changi Prison, where he continued to serve his sentence. By 2019, Chua's ex-wife observed that her ex-husband was growing more aggressive towards her during her visits, speculating that the medication had not worked on Chua, and she last visited him in November 2019, before speaking to him over the phone in June 2020. Still, Chua was periodically assessed and he did not display any suicidal tendencies, and this was further noted by Chua's cellmate and prison officers. Chua's conduct while in prison also showed a positive evaluation that he may be eligible for release on parole upon reaching the twenty-year mark of his sentence, and he made plans to live with his mother upon his future release.

According to Chua's mother, her son continually expressed remorse for his crime and the trauma he inflicted on the seven-year-old girl, and he felt sorry for causing much hardship and distress to his family. His life while in prison was also not a smooth one, as claimed by his family who visited him twice a month.

=== Death ===
On the morning of 8 July 2020, after being given their medication, the inmates of the psychiatric housing unit were allowed to come out of their respective cells for one hour of television time. Chua, who was described as a "reclusive", did not join the others to watch television, and he preferred to roam the day room alone for a walk, which he usually did for the past few months without issue.

However, prison officers noticed something amiss as the CCTV cameras captured Chua walking up the stairs from the third floor to the fourth floor, where he began climbing up railings that had bars across them. He climbed sideways from the bars, using them as steps, until he was on the fourth level. By the time the prison officers arrived to stop him, it was too late as Chua released his grip and fell backwards before the first officer could reach him, and he hit his head onto the foot of the stairs at the third floor. As a result of the fall, Chua, who sustained a head injury, could not be revived despite efforts by officers to resuscitate him, and he died at Changi General Hospital at 10.15 am. At the time of his death, Chua Ser Lien was 58 years old and he had served 16 years, six months and 12 days behind bars.

Chua's funeral took place for five days and after his cremation, his ashes were laid to rest at Mandai Crematorium. However, Chua's death was not reported in the media until the coverage of the coroner's inquiry into his death.

=== Coroner's inquiry ===
On 22 December 2020, nearly 17 years after the kidnapping, a coroner's inquiry found no indication of foul play or negligence on the part of the prison officers and ruled Chua's death as suicide after a five-month investigation.

The coroner, Dr Marvin Bay, noted in his report that Chua had been receiving appropriate treatment for his illness during the time of his incarceration and offered his condolences to Chua's family. Chua's 82-year-old mother, who discovered her son's cause of death was suicide upon the reporting of the coroner's verdict, told Chinese newspapers that she was devastated to know that her son killed himself. She said that when she and her husband received news of their son's death, they never knew it was suicide, a fact left out by her other children. Chua's mother remained heartbroken over the death of her son, whom she thought would reunite with her upon his release from prison.

As an aftermath of the incident, the Singapore Prison Service decided that no inmate would be allowed to remain alone outside their cells. High-risk inmates will be warded in the prison's medical centre. The authorities also considered reviewing the prison's infrastructure and is considering to install a sensor system that would be triggered whenever anyone tries to move close to the railings, which they installed to prevent anyone from falling off the 2nd floor (it also ironically caused Chua to fall to his death). CNA reported that the railings are likely to be replaced with ones that cannot be gripped or held onto.

== See also ==
- Tan Ping Koon
- Vincent Lee Chuan Leong
- Caning in Singapore
- Life imprisonment in Singapore
- Capital punishment in Singapore
- List of kidnappings
