= Peter Lim =

Singaporean businessman and philanthropist

- 林荣福
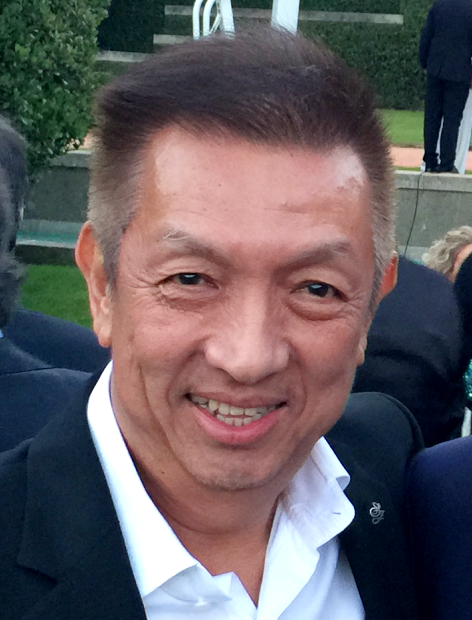
- Lim in 2016
- Born: Peter Lim Eng Hock; 21 May 1953 (age 73); Colony of Singapore
- Education: University of Western Australia
- Occupations: Businessman; investor
- Known for: Stockbroking; Owner of Valencia CF
- Spouses: Teo Geok Fong (m. 1990–2002) Cherie Lim (m. 2003)
- Children: 2, including Kiat Lim

Peter Lim Eng Hock (Note: simplified Chinese: 林荣福; traditional Chinese: 林榮福; pinyin: Lín Róngfú) (born 21 May 1953) is a Singaporean business magnate who was a stockbroker and an investor in palm oil, and is now a private investor focused on healthcare, property, sports, and education. In 2024, he was ranked 26th on Forbes' list of Singapore's 50 Richest with a net worth of US$1.75 billion. He was a shareholder of English club Salford City until 2024 and has been the owner of Spanish club Valencia CF since 2014.

In 2010, Lim won the biggest libel payout in Singapore's history in the Raffles Town Club saga.

== Early life and education ==
The son of a fishmonger, Lim and his seven siblings grew up in a two-bedroom government flat in the Bukit Ho Swee public housing estate. Lim completed his secondary school education at the Raffles Institution. After National Service, he went to Perth to study at the University of Western Australia. To fund his university education, Lim worked part-time doing odd jobs as a taxi driver, cook and waiter.

While working at Australian fast-food chain Red Rooster, Lim studied how businesses are started, how they grow, and how they scale up.

He graduated with a degree in accounting and finance and first worked in accountancy and tax consultancy before going into stocks.

== Early career ==
In the early 1990s, Lim invested about US$10 million in a start-up palm-oil company, Wilmar. In 2010, Lim cashed out at the peak of commodity prices and sold his Wilmar shares for US$1.5 billion.

Lim was known as the "Remisier King" (commission king) due to his success as a stockbroker in the 1980s.

Lim quit the brokerage business in 1996 and became a private investor.

== Sports investment ==
Lim owns a controlling stake in Spanish La Liga club Valencia CF, and Hotel Football next to Old Trafford stadium in Manchester. He previously owned stakes in British sports car maker McLaren Automotive and Salford City F.C. Since becoming majority shareholder of Valencia CF in 2014, the club has qualified for the UEFA Champions League three times and won the Copa del Rey in 2019. Separately, Salford City achieved four promotions in five seasons to reach League Two in 2019, and won the delayed 2020 Papa John's Trophy.

In 2010, Lim expressed interest in purchasing Liverpool Football Club, submitting a bid of £320 million cash offer for the club. Liverpool FC was eventually sold to New England Sports Ventures.

In October 2021, Lim co-founded ZujuGP with his son.

== Philanthropy ==
In June 2010 the Singapore Olympic Foundation (SOF) set up the SOF-Peter Lim Scholarship with a S$10 million donation from Lim. The gift is the single largest donation in Singapore from an individual towards sports development. The recipients are typically students who come from financially challenged backgrounds and have demonstrated a potential to excel in their respective sports. In 2019, Lim further pledged to continue supporting young local athletes for another 10 years from 2021 to 2030 by donating another $10 million to the SOF-Peter Lim Scholarship. From 2011 to 2023, 4,519 student-athletes from 54 sports have received scholarships amounting to S$10.45 million.

Lim further committed a separate S$20 million to start a new community project focused on helping children from less privileged backgrounds, with the aim of helping them reach their potential.

In 2011, Lim donated S$2 million for the HCIS-Peter Lim Scholarship Fund for students with exceptional academic merit, but with financial constraints in a two-year scholarship covering the International Baccalaureate Diploma Program, in which tuition fees would be paid for in full.

In 2014, Lim also endowed Nanyang Technological University with S$3 million to fund a professorship in peace studies at the S. Rajaratnam School of International Studies to protect and promote harmony in Singapore.

In 2018, Lim donated S$900,000 over three years to build Therapeutic Gardens in Telok Blangah, Punggol and Bedok Reservoir.

In 2020, in a partnership with NParks, Lim pledged S$10 million to set up the NParks – Peter Lim Scholarship for youth from less privileged backgrounds to pursue their interests in landscaping, horticulture, ecology, veterinary and animal science sectors. Since its inception in 2020, study awards under the NParks – Peter Lim Scholarship have been given out to over 750 students in Singapore.

In 2022, Lim pledged S$680,000 to the Peter Lim Sports Ignite Grant to provide children and youth from disadvantaged backgrounds with the platform to pursue their sports interests and skills development. The grant also aims to empower girls to pursue their interests in sports and science, technology, engineering, arts and mathematics (STEAM).
