= 2004 in Singapore =

- Decades: 1980s; 1990s; 2000s; 2010s; 2020s
- See also: Other events of 2004; Timeline of Singaporean history

The following lists events that happened during 2004 in Singapore.

== Incumbents ==
- President: S.R. Nathan
- Prime Minister: Goh Chok Tong (until 12 August), Lee Hsien Loong (starting 12 August)

== Events ==
=== January ===
- 1 January – The Goods and Services Tax is raised from 4% to 5%.
- 3 January – The Millennia Institute is established from a merger of other Centralised Institutes.
- 8 January – The Infocomm Development Authority of Singapore announced that phone numbers starting with '8' will become available from April after high demand for phone numbers starting with '9'.

=== February ===
- 3 February – The Braddell Flyover is opened to traffic.
- 12 February – The Carlsberg Sky Tower (renamed to Tiger Sky Tower) is opened.
- 22 February – Plans for a new hospital in Jurong were postponed in favour for one in the north. These plans were elaborated on 22 March, when the Health Ministry announced a Northern General Hospital (now Khoo Teck Puat Hospital) in Yishun.

=== March ===
- 9 March – The Singapore Tourism Board launched a new tourism campaign called Uniquely Singapore.
- 13 March – A new pre-tertiary arts school (now School of the Arts) is announced during a parliamentary debate to cater for students between the ages of 13 and 18.
- 17 March – The Ministry of Education announced more flexibility for school admissions and an all-rounded school ranking system.
- 18 March –
  - The Ministry of Education announced that the EM1 and EM2 streams will be merged.
  - The chewing gum ban is partially lifted with the launch of Nicorette, a smoking cessation gum.
- 26 March – The Arts House is opened.
- 23 March – The Immigration and Checkpoints Authority's Coastal Command Headquarters on Pulau Brani is officially opened by then Minister for Home Affairs Wong Kan Seng.
- 29 March – The M18 and R21 ratings are introduced, among other changes.
- 31 March – The Old National Library Building at Fort Canning is closed for the building of Fort Canning Tunnel.

=== April ===
- 1 April –
  - Two statutory boards, the Accounting and Corporate Regulatory Authority and Singapore Examinations and Assessment Board are formed.
  - All hawker centres are now managed by the National Environment Agency, taking over roles previously held by the Housing and Development Board and JTC Corporation.
- 2 April – The Singapore Sports School is officially opened.
- 13 April – A blackout hits several parts of Singapore including Choa Chu Kang, affecting 80,000 households and lasting almost an hour. Investigations found that a cable fault was responsible for the event.
- 20 April – A section of Nicoll Highway collapsed, four workers were killed.

=== May ===
- 1 May –
  - The National Trades Union Congress's new headquarters, One Marina Boulevard is officially opened.
  - Singapore Pools is transferred to the Singapore Totalisator Board; present-day Tote Board (a statutory board of the Ministry of Finance), taking over this role from Temasek Holdings.
- 4 May –
  - The first $10 polymer notes are released.
  - Valuair launches its first flights.
- 10 May – SMRT and TIBS were officially merged, whereas SMRT Buses was formed.
- 14 May – The Media Development Authority (MDA) awards the 99.5FM frequency to MediaCorp under MediaCorp Radio. The new station, GROOVES 99.5FM (renamed Lush 99.5FM) will broadcast local music and arts programmes, as well as jazz and programmes by tertiary students. The station will start broadcasting by end 2004.
- 19 May – First Lieutenant Brandon Loo of the Republic of Singapore Air Force is killed when his F-16 jet crashed while on training from the Luke Air Force Base in Arizona.
- 21 May – The Changi Naval Base is officially opened.
- 29 May – StarHub launches its new digital cable TV service.

=== June ===
- 1 June – Security guards are now deployed in MRT stations.
- 4 June – Hippo City Sightseeing bus in Singapore started operations.
- 5 June – Wild Wild Wet, a water theme park opens to the public in Downtown East.
- 15 June – MINDEF announced that National Service will be cut from 2.5 to 2 years from the December 2004 batch.
- 18 June – The third NEWater plant opened in Seletar. It operated for seven years until its closure in 2011.
- 29 June – A blackout occurred for the second time, affecting about one–third of Singapore residents. Investigations reveal that the blackout was caused by a disruption of natural gas supply from Indonesia.

=== July ===
- 20 July – The National Security Secretariat is renamed to National Security Coordination Secretariat as part of an enhanced national security plan.

=== August ===
- 12 August – Lee Hsien Loong was sworn as the third Prime Minister.
- 22 August – Pro-family policies were introduced during the National Day Rally. Among the measures include an enhanced Baby Bonus scheme, increased maternity leave to 12 weeks, more childcare options, a five-day work week, among others. In addition, female civil servants can claim medical benefits for their dependant unmarried children below 18 year and spouses from 1 January 2005, as well as two-day childcare leave for each parent from 1 October.

=== September ===
- 1 September – Punggol Plaza managed by Koufu and NTUC Fairprice is officially opened and connected to Coral Edge LRT Station in Punggol, Singapore.
- 2 September – The Media Development Authority allows the sale of Cosmopolitan, a women-oriented magazine, coming after a 22-year ban since 1982 on the grounds of nudity. However, the magazine will be shrink-wrapped with the label 'Unsuitable for the Young' to protect vulnerable consumers.
- 15 September – Tiger Airways launches its first flights. At the same time, a new low cost terminal will be built by 2006, with Tiger Airways being the first to use the terminal when it opens.
- 17 September – In a bid to stem losses, Mediacorp and Singapore Press Holdings (SPH) announced the merging of their media operations. A new holding company Mediacorp TV will be created with Mediacorp owning 80 percent and SPH holding the remaining 20 percent. In addition, Mediacorp Press will continue to be owned by Mediacorp; holding a 60 percent stake with 40 percent to be sold to SPH. Channel i will be reviewed for commercial viability while Streats will be merged into Today.
- 23 September – VivoCity, formerly known as the HarbourFront Mall, is unveiled, opening in December 2006.
- 24 September – The Direct School Admission was announced, allowing Primary 6 and Secondary 4 students to be guaranteed a place in a secondary school and junior college of their choice respectively. The scheme took effect from the 2005 cohort.
- 26 September – Reviews were announced for education awards, new school achievement tables and the scrapping of rankings for IP schools and junior colleges.
- 30 September – PSA International sells its stake in CWT, a logistics company.

=== October ===
- 2 October – The Yellow Ribbon Project and Yellow Ribbon Fund are officially launched to give ex-convicts a second chance.
- 29 October – The first units of The Sail @ Marina Bay are launched, which is jointly developed by City Developments Limited and AIG Global Real Estate.

=== November ===
- 29 November – The Changi Air Base (East) is officially opened.
- 30 November – Temasek Holdings acquires HDB Corp (present-day Surbana Jurong) as part of Housing and Development Board's divestment, allowing it to expand overseas to new markets in Asia. Likewise, entry barriers for private companies will be lifted from July 2006 with HDB Corp allowed access into private sector projects from 2007 onwards.

=== December ===
- 4 December – The Nicoll Highway reopens to traffic, months after the collapse.
- 6 December – The Media Development Authority (MDA) approves the merger involving both Mediacorp' and Singapore Press Holdings' free-to-air television operations, first announced in September.
- 13 December – Jetstar Asia launches its first flights.
- 29 December – The Boon Lay Extension of the East West MRT line is announced. The 3.8 km (2.4 miles) extension will be finished by 2009, with 2 elevated stations to be built.
- 31 December –
  - MediaCorp and Singapore Press Holdings (SPH) complete their merger, creating the new holding company MediaCorp TV. Channel i ceased transmission the following day, while Channel U joined MediaCorp. In addition, Streats prints its last issue, merging into Today the next day.
  - Radio station Lush 99.5FM starts transmission.

== Births ==
- 9 January - Aqil Yazid, footballer
- 4 March - Nur Muhammad Asis, footballer
- 6 April - Kieran Teo, footballer
  - 8 May –
- Adam Reefdy, footballer
- Khairin Nadim, footballer
- 21 June - Amir Syafiz, footballer
- 20 July - Junki Kenn Yoshimura, footballer
- 24 December - Aizil Yazid, footballer

== Deaths ==
- 6 February – Fong Chong Pik, one of the prominent leaders of the Malayan Communist Party in Singapore (b. 1924).
- 21 February – Khoo Teck Puat, banker and hotel owner (b. 1917).
- 2 March – Esther Ang, murder victim of Siti Aminah and Juminem (b. 1957).
- 2 April – Bock Tuan Thong, murder victim of Tony Koh Zhan Quan, Lim Poh Lye, and Ng Kim Soon (b. 1948).
- 17 May – Chitrabathy Narayanasamy, murder victim of G. Krishnasamy Naidu (b. 1965).
- 1 June – Liu Kang, artist (b. 1911).
- 7 July – Phyllis Eu Cheng Li, first woman elected into office in Singapore (b. 1914).
- 6 August – Lien Ying Chow, founder of Overseas Union Bank (b. 1906).
- 29 August – Lin Chen, theatre director and playwright (b. 1919).
- 10 October – Huang Na, murder victim of Took Leng How (b. 1996).
- 12 October – Sindee Neo, murder and kidnapping victim of Constance Chee Cheong Hin (b. 2000).
- 16 November – Goh Sin Tub, writer (b. 1927).
- 4 December
  - Harbans Singh, former secretary general of the United People's Front (b. 1926).
  - Pacita Abad, painter (b. 1946).
- 7 December – Cheng Yik Hung, founder of Wing Tai Group (b. 1911).

=== Unknown date ===
- Christopher Henry Rothwell Allen, actor, director, winner of 1983 Cultural Medallion for Theatre (b. 1933).
