= NewspaperSG =

Online newspaper archive of Singapore

- Website type: Online archive
- Founded: 2010
- Country of origin: Singapore
- Website: eresources.nlb.gov.sg/newspapers/

NewspaperSG is an online newspaper archive launched in 2010 containing newspapers distributed in Singapore, including those published in the 19th century.

== History ==
The National Library Board and Singapore Press Holdings signed an agreement in 2007 to make digitised articles of The Straits Times available for public access at NLB libraries. NewspaperSG was launched on 28 January 2010. At the archive's launch, it included 14 newspapers, including the New Nation, Sin Chew Jit Poh, Nanyang Siang Pau, Berita Harian, the Singapore Weekly Herald, the Straits Mail, The Business Times, today, Streats, the Malayan Saturday Post, the Straits Observer, and the Straits Telegraph and Daily Advertiser.

In December 2017, six more newspapers were added to the archive, the Syonan Shimbun, Comrade, the Indian Daily Mail, the Malaya Tribune, the Morning Tribune, and the Sunday Tribune bringing the number of newspapers on the site to 41.
