= List of newspapers in Singapore =

The following is a list of newspapers in Singapore, including those that are currently in publication as well as those that have since ceased operations.

== In circulation ==
=== Singapore's major daily newspapers ===
Newspaper	Language	Publisher	Format	Founded
Berita Harian	Malay	SPH Media	daily broadsheet	1 July 1957; 69 years ago
Lianhe Zaobao (联合早报)	Chinese	SPH Media	daily broadsheet	16 March 1983; 43 years ago
Tamil Murasu (தமிழ் முரசு)	Tamil	SPH Media	daily broadsheet	2 May 1936; 90 years ago
The Business Times	English	SPH Media	Financial daily broadsheet	1 October 1976; 49 years ago
The Straits Times	English	SPH Media	daily broadsheet	15 July 1845; 181 years ago

=== Secondary newspaper ===
Newspaper	Language	Publisher	Format	Founded	Average daily circulation (2013)	Average daily circulation (2016)
zbCOMMA (早报逗号)	Chinese	SPH Media	weekly tabloid	1 January 1994; 32 years ago	54,400	40,400
Shin Min Daily News (新明日报)	Chinese	SPH Media	general daily broadsheet	18 March 1967; 59 years ago	130,600	100,300 (print + digital)
tabla!	English	SPH Media	general free weekly tabloid	10 October 2008; 17 years ago	30,000	

== Defunct papers ==
Prior to the dominance of The Straits Times in recent decades, Singapore had a diverse landscape of prominent English-language newspapers. The earliest among them was The Singapore Chronicle, established in 1824 as the first newspaper in Singapore. It served the settlement for over a decade before ceasing publication in 1837. In the early twentieth century, The Malaya Tribune emerged as a major competitor and, at its peak, outsold The Straits Times. However, it experienced a significant decline following the Japanese occupation of Singapore and ultimately ceased operations in 1951.

Other notable publications included the Singapore Tiger Standard, an English-language morning daily founded in 1950, which came under criticism for its editorial stance. It was labelled "anti-Merdeka" by S. Rajaratnam and was closed in 1959 following the rise to power of the People's Action Party (PAP). In 1971, the Government initiated a crackdown on media outlets perceived to be under foreign influence or exhibiting subversive tendencies. This led to the closure of both The Eastern Sun and the Singapore Herald.

=== English language ===
- Comrade (1946)
- Daily Advertiser (1890–1894)
- Democrat (1946)
- Eastern Daily Mail (1905–1906)
- Eastern News (1940–1941)
- Eastern Sun (closed in 1971 for allegation on receiving money from communist intelligence from Hong Kong)
- Free Press
- Indian Daily Mail (1946–1956)
- Malacca Observer
- Malay Daily Chronicle
- Malaya Tribune
- Malayan Saturday Post Illustrated
- Malayan Saturday Review
- Mid-Day Herald and Daily Advertiser
- Morning Tribune
- My Paper (merged with "The New Paper" on 1 December 2016)
- New Nation (1971–1982)
- Penang Guardian and Mercantile Avertiser
- Pinang Gazette and Straits Chronicle
- Project Eyeball (folded on 1 January 2002, less than two years after its release)
- Reporter's Advertiser
- Shipping Gazette
- Singapore & F.M.S. Weekly Advertiser
- Singapore Chronicle and Commercial Register
- Singapore Chronicle (1824–1837)
- Singapore Daily News
- Singapore Daily Times
- Singapore Herald (1939–1941)
- Singapore Herald (closed in 1971)
- Singapore Monitor
- Singapore Nippo
- Singapore Tiger Standard or Singapore Standard (1950–1959)
- Singapore Weekly Herald
- Straits Advocate
- Straits Budget
- Straits Echo
- Straits Guardian
- Straits Intelligence (1883–1886)
- Straits Mail
- Straits Maritime Journal and General News
- Straits Produce
- Straits Telegraph and Daily Advertiser
- Straits-Chinese Herald
- Streats (merged with Today on 1 January 2005)
- Sunday Mirror
- Syonan Shimbun
- Syonan Shimbun Fortnightly
- The Singapore Free Press (1835–1962)
- The New Paper (1988–2025) (merged with "STOMP on 30 October 2025)
- Today (2000–2024)
- Weekend TODAY
- Weekly Sun

=== Chinese language ===
In 1982, editorial executives of Nanyang Siang Pau were accused of propagating "Chinese ethnic chauvinism" and was detained without trial for a period of two years, and publication of The Chinese Daily was briefly halted.

- Chong Shing Yit Pao (中興日報) – established on 20 August 1907; disestablished in 1910. The newspaper was founded and operated by members of the Tongmenghui and was aimed at promoting the 1911 Xinhai Revolution in China. The members responsible for the newspaper were Tan Chor Lam, Teo Eng Hock and Chan Po-yin. The daily distribution involved 1,000 copies.
- Friday Weekly (星期5周报) – established on 21 February 1991; disestablished on 7 January 2009 as zbCOMMA. The newspaper is targeted at secondary school students.
- Lat Pau (1881–1932)
- Lianhe Wanbao (联合晚报) – established on 16 March 1983; disestablished on 24 December 2021. Merged with Shin Min Daily News (新明日报).
- Nanyang Siang Pau (南洋商报) – established on 6 September 1923; disestablished on 16 March 1983 as Lianhe Zaobao and Lianhe Wanbao
- Nan Chiau Jit Pao
- Sin Chew Jit Poh (星洲日报) – established on 15 January 1929; disestablished on 16 March 1983 as Lianhe Zaobao and Lianhe Wanbao
- Sin Kuo Min Jit Poh
- Sing Po
- The Union Times (1906–1948)
- Thien Nan Shin Pao (1898–1905)
- Xiao Xian Zhong
- Xin Li Bao
- Ye Deng Bao
- Zhaonan Ribao (1942–1945)

=== Tamil language ===
- Singai Nesan (1887–1889)

=== Malay language ===
- Lembang Malaya
- Jawi Peranakkan (1876–1895)
- Nujum Al-Fajar
- Sekolah Melayu
- Warta Ahad
- Warta Jenaka
- Warta Malaya

== See also ==
- Censorship in Singapore
- Communications in Singapore
- Media of Singapore
