= Project Eyeball =

Former newspaper in Singapore

- Type: Daily newspaper
- Format: Tabloid
- Owner: Singapore Press Holdings
- Publisher: Singapore Press Holdings
- Editor: Bertha Henson
- Founded: 12 August 2000; 25 years ago
- Ceased publication: 28 June 2001; 24 years ago
- Language: English
- Headquarters: Level 7, SPH Media Centre; 82 Genting Lane; Singapore 349567

Project Eyeball was an English-language daily newspaper in Singapore. It launched in 2000, and ceased publishing less than a year later. Singapore's first new daily newspaper in twelve years since the launch of The New Paper, it was targeted at a 20-40 demographic and was the first newspaper to combine both print and digital formats; the print edition was published every morning from Monday to Saturday and the website was constantly updated, with content that appeared in the online edition often appearing in the next day's print edition. Competition from newly-launched free newspapers, SPH's Streats and Mediacorp's Today, as well as cost issues, led to its closure.

== Name ==
The name Project Eyeball was initially a code name but became suited for the newspaper. "Project" implied an "experimental or ongoing" connotation, while "Eyeball" was an internet term, which also had a "perspective of sense and vision", emphasising the fact that it was an internet product.

== History ==
Work for the paper began as early as August 1999 (the launch print issue said that it had been in the works for "12 months").

Project Eyeball received its licence on 16 February 2000, in order to reach an "internet-savvy" audience ages 20 to 40, and that could not read its main publication The Straits Times due to either lack of time or other activities, such as using the internet. Henson had left The Straits Times the previous year to commence work on the new newspaper, and hoped to have a staff of 100 when it was fully operational, including non-journalists. By the time of the licence, most staff was recruited through its website. It would also give a niche platform to advertisers. In May, it was announced that its website would be hosted at AsiaOne.

A press conference was held on the morning of 6 June 2000, eyeing the launch of the website in July and the print publication in August. The purpose of the early launch of the website was to shape up opinion for readers about what the print version would be. The views posted on its website would help shape up the following day's print edition. Upon launch, it would be delivered to subscribers' homes, bought in newsstands or picked up in cafés such as Starbucks. Its initial circulation was expected to be between 25,000 and 35,000 copies, hoping to increase to 100,000 in five years. Bertha Henson said in an interview to The New Paper that it would be open to anti-government views, but would not tolerate certain controversial topics.

The website launched on 17 July 2000. Until the first print issue on 12 August, the website was used to give ideas from readers; the winners would win SG$15,000. A sneak preview of both versions was presented to advertisers a few days before (14 July) at the Shangri-La Hotel. Features exclusive to the online version included audio and video broadcasts, MP3 files, links to "related and past reports" and other news websites. On the launch date, the website featured the following message:

We are here!

Welcome, intrepid surfers!

Project Eyeball is launched, well, almost. What you're seeing here is not the promised e-newspaper - no, that comes next month.

On 20 July, Bertha Henson held a live chat between 8pm and 9:30pm on its website. Interested users could also receive a one-week trial run of the print version for free. During the initial week of publication, it planned to give away 120,000 issues. Usually, an edition would have 48, pages, but for its first edition, it had a bumper special of over 60 pages.

The launch party was held at the Shaw House amphitheatre on 12 August 2000 from 12pm to 6pm, with prizes including MP3 players. The first 2,000 to get an annual subscription would receive promotional packages worth SG$700, including WAP-enabled cellphones.

=== Closure ===
Ten months into its operation, the publication was experiencing losses of SG$4.8 million. SPH was considering closing it, if that happened, it would become the first major SPH title to do so. On 28 June 2001, SPH announced that it would suspend both the print and online editions of Project Eyeball from the following day; the 28 June issue would be its last in both formats. Several factors led to this decision: low circulation rate, failing to reach the 30,000 copy benchmark in its first year, low advertising revenue (which caused SPH to lose SG$13.3 million) and the depletion of its initial three-year budget. Moreover, in its brief run, two new free newspapers (Streats and Today) appeared, which led to fierce competition. At closing time, it employed 65 staff, of which 19 were retrenched and the remaining 46 moved to other SPH units, more than half of which to The Straits Times. Henson also noticed that her team made the newspaper feel like a tech newspaper.
