= Singapore media mergers of 2004 and 2017 =

On 31 December 2004, Singapore's national broadcaster MediaCorp and SPH MediaWorks, the broadcasting arm of Singapore Press Holdings, agreed to merge their operations, with the merger taking effect on 1 January 2005. This merger arrangement remained in effect until 29 September 2017, when SPH exited the partnership by divesting its stake in MediaCorp.

== Background ==
On 5 June 2000, Singapore’s Ministry of Information and the Arts announced the gradual introduction of media competition, allowing MediaCorp to own a newspaper and Singapore Press Holdings (SPH) to operate two television and two radio channels.

On 8 June 2000, SPH, the country’s main newspaper publisher, established a television division called SPH MediaWorks to compete with MediaCorp, which dominated Singapore’s media landscape. On 9 June 2000, the Ministry of Information and the Arts granted MediaCorp a licence to operate a newspaper, which became known as Today.

The rival channels became embroiled in a ratings battle, with some politicians remarking that the local market was too small to sustain two broadcasting companies. By 2004, SPH MediaWorks had accumulated approximately $44.5 million in losses.

== Merger ==
On 17 September 2004, SPH announced that its television subsidiary, MediaWorks, would merge with MediaCorp’s TV division. A new holding company, MediaCorp TV, would be established, with MediaCorp holding an 80% stake and SPH the remaining 20%. Additionally, MediaCorp Press would remain under MediaCorp ownership, with a 60% stake, while SPH would acquire the other 40%. The commercial viability of Channel i would be reviewed, and Streats would be merged with Today. The merger received approval from the Media Development Authority (MDA) on 6 December 2004.

Following the merger, 429 MediaWorks employees were affected; 200 were transferred to MediaCorp, 132 to SPH, and 97 were retrenched. Of those offered positions at MediaCorp, 189 accepted.

Channel i ceased broadcasting on 1 January 2005, with its channel allocation later being taken over by Okto, which aired from 19 October 2008 until 1 May 2019. Channel U was rebranded as MediaCorp Channel U and became a complementary channel to MediaCorp’s Chinese-language Channel 8. Several artistes, news anchors, and presenters were transferred to MediaCorp, including former employees of MediaCorp’s predecessors, Television Corporation of Singapore and Television Twelve.

In print media, several newspaper operations were merged under MediaCorp Press Ltd., with SPH acquiring a 40% share in Today.

== Divestment ==
On 25 August 2017, SPH announced the divestment of its 20% stake in MediaCorp TV and its 40% stake in MediaCorp Press, allowing SPH to refocus on its core media businesses. MediaCorp acquired these shares for S$18 million, making both MediaCorp TV and MediaCorp Press fully owned subsidiaries of MediaCorp. This announcement followed MediaCorp’s decision to cease the print edition of Today and shift to a digital-only format from the end of September 2017, in response to a growing preference for online news. The digital transition led to 40 roles being made redundant.

Under the terms of the digital shift, MediaCorp agreed not to publish Today in a hardcopy-like digital format for five years. The acquisition of SPH’s stakes was finalized on 29 September 2017, effectively ending the media competition introduced in 2000.

== See also ==
- Mediacorp
- SPH MediaWorks
