= Eastern Sun =

Defunct daily newspaper in Singapore

- Type: Daily newspaper
- Owner(s): Aw Kow
- Founder(s): Aw Kow
- Founded: July 17, 1966
- Ceased publication: May 16, 1971; 54 years ago

Eastern Sun was an English-language newspaper that ran from 1966 to 1971 in Singapore. In 1971, Eastern Sun was exposed for having ties to a communist agency in Hong Kong, and that they would be paid to not oppose the People's Republic of China on major issues and would remain neutral on minor ones.

== History ==
Eastern Sun was founded in 1966 by Aw Kow, the son of Tiger Balm founder Aw Boon Haw, using HK$3 million that he borrowed from a communist news agency based in Hong Kong. In return, Aw had to repay the loan at a "ridiculously low rate interest of 0.1 percent per annum".

Soon after the newspaper started, they faced financial problems. From January 1967 to March 1968, communist officials gave Aw another HK$1.2 million, but with an added condition that he must appoint their representative as an adviser to the newspaper.

In 1971, Eastern Sun and The Singapore Herald were both discovered to have been run using foreign funding and were accused by Prime Minister Lee Kuan Yew on May 11 of having been involved in "black operations" through the biased news that they published. On 13 May 1971, Eastern Sun stated that they had been "unfairly lumped" with The Singapore Herald.

On 15 May 1971, the government released a statement saying that loans totaling HK$1.2 million had been made by a "Communist intelligence organization in Hong Kong" to Aw. The government also stated that in all, Aw received up to HK$7.2 million in 1968.

On 18 May 1971, after these accusations, the Eastern Sun shut down due to their editor-in-chief, Sam Krishniah, and six other senior expatriate staff leaving the newspaper.

== Aftermath ==
The shutting down of Eastern Sun and The Singapore Herald, along with Nanyang Siang Pau, led to the Newspaper and Printing Presses Act 1974 to prevent foreign ownership of Singapore newspapers.

In 2019, Minister of Home Affairs K. Shanmugam used the Eastern Sun and The Singapore Herald as examples in Parliament to explain the need of barring foreigners from controlling or funding Singapore newspapers.

== See also ==
- Censorship in Singapore
- List of newspapers in Singapore
