= Ryan Hodierne =

South African sports scientist

- Born: 1983 (age 42–43)
- Education: University of Pretoria – Human Movement & Sports Sciences
- Occupation: Sports biomechanist
- Employer: Singapore Sports Institute

Ryan Hodierne (born 1983) is a South African sports scientist. A biomechanist with the Sports Science Centre at Singapore Sports Institute, Hodierne is one of those to whom Joseph Schooling paid tribute for his 2016 Summer Olympics success, including the nutritionist Kirsty Fairbairn and high-performance manager Sonya Porter.

In an interview with the Singapore newspaper Today, Schooling called him "the best I have seen in biomechanics". Hodierne analyzed previous race footage and told Schooling the predicted movements of his fellow racers based on biomechanics.

== Career ==
Hodierne is a member of the High Performance Advisory Committee to South African Sports Confederation and Olympic Committee (SASCOC).

He previously worked with the South African swimmer Chad le Clos.
