= True Files =

- 真实档案
- Genre: Crime
- Starring: Lim Kay Tong; Tay Ping Hui; Chew Chor Meng; Edmund Chen
- Country of origin: Singapore
- Original language: English
- No. of seasons: 5
- No. of episodes: 62

Production
- Running time: approx. 20 minutes

Original release
- Network: MediaCorp
- Release: 22 April 2002 – 18 March 2007

Related
- True Courage

True Files (Chinese: 真实档案) is an English language television docu-drama telecast on MediaCorp Channel 5, with each episode (except the last episode of Season 3, The Unsolved) re-enacting major court proceedings, mostly of murder, in Singapore. When the inaugural season was telecast in 2002, its first episode was re-slotted to be telecast later, when numerous public feedback was received by the station complaining that it was too graphic after watching trailers for the pilot episode. The show was also pushed back to a 10 p.m. time slot from the fourth episode onwards as a result. Nonetheless, the hype helped the show to enjoy favourable viewership ratings. Over five years, a total of five seasons had been telecasted, with the final season airing in 2007.

The show was hosted and narrated by veteran actor Lim Kay Tong from Seasons 1 to 4. In Season 5, the host is Tay Ping Hui, and the narration is done by Brian Richmond.

Currently, the show is viewable on meWATCH (previously named Toggle). 60 out of 62 episodes (except for The Bukit Merah Maid Trial and Girl Thrown To Her Death episodes) is available on the said website from 5 February 2016 onwards.

== Episodes ==
=== Season 1 (Thursdays, 10.00 p.m. (Tuesdays, 8:30 p.m. for 1st to 3rd episodes) ===
- 1. (23 April 2002): Gold Bars Triple Murders (Public Prosecutor v Chou Hock Guan Andrew and Others) (See: Gold Bars Triple Murders)
- 2. (30 April 2002): The Trial of Mimi Wong (Public Prosecutor v Mimi Wong alias Wong Weng Siu and Sim Woh Kum alias Sim Wor Kum) (See: Mimi Wong and Sim Woh Kum)
- 3. (7 May 2002): Cries of A Child (Public Prosecutor v Ng Cha Boo) (See: Murder of Eva Soh)
- 4. (16 May 2002): The Trial of Adrian Lim (Public Prosecutor v Adrian Lim and Others) (See: Toa Payoh Ritual Murders)
- 5. (23 May 2002): Who Killed Winnie Spencer? (Public Prosecutor v Joseph Michael Nonis)
- 6. (30 May 2002): The Tenant (Public Prosecutor v Michael Tan Teow and Another) (See: Ang Mo Kio family murders)
- 7. (6 June 2002): The Trial of Sunny Ang (Public Prosecutor v Sunny Ang) (See: Sunny Ang)
- 8. (13 June 2002): The Sentry (Public Prosecutor v Ong Hwee Kuan and Others) (See: Murder of Lee Kim Lai)
- 9. (20 June 2002): The Paedophile (Public Prosecutor v Lim Hock Hin Kelvin) (see: Kelvin Lim Hock Hin)
- 10. (4 July 2002): The Horror! (Public Prosecutor v Ong Li Xia and Another [2000] SGHC 149) (see: 1999 Ang Mo Kio torture case)
- 11. (11 July 2002): Trusting Your Killer (Public Prosecutor v Shaiful Edham bin Adam and Another [1998] SGHC 364) (See: Murder of Iordanka Apostolova)
- 12. (18 July 2002): Murder For Coins (Public Prosecutor v Lau Lee Peng [1999] SGHC 315) (See: 1998 Tampines flat murder)
- 13. (25 July 2002): The Burnt Body Case (Public Prosecutor v Ramu Annadavascan and Another) (See: East Coast Parkway murder)
- 14. (1 August 2002): Tourist From Hell (Public Prosecutor v John Martin Scripps)

=== Season 2 (Tuesdays, 10.00 p.m.) ===
- 1. (26 August 2003): Murder He Wrote (CC 59/2001 - Public Prosecutor v Anthony Ler Wee Teang and Another) (See: Anthony Ler)
- 2. (2 September 2003): Triple Murder (Public Prosecutor v Sek Kim Wah) (See: Andrew Road triple murders)
- 3. (9 September 2003): Maid Abused To Death (CC 39/2002 - Public Prosecutor v Ng Hua Chye) (See: Killing of Muawanatul Chasanah)
- 4. (16 September 2003): The School Bus Driver (CC 23/1991 - Public Prosecutor v Oh Laye Koh) (See: Murder of Liang Shan Shan)
- 5. (23 September 2003): Murder Of Inspector T. Maniam (CC 59/1999 - Public Prosecutor v Loganatha Venkatesan and Others) (See: Murder of T. Maniam)
- 6. (30 September 2003): The Duck Den Murder (CC 53/1997 - Public Prosecutor v Lim Chin Chong) (See: Duck Den murder)
- 7. (7 October 2003): Murder Of Her Landlady (CC 46/1997 - Public Prosecutor v Mansoor s/o Abdullah and Others) (See: 1997 Kallang landlady murder)
- 8. (14 October 2003): Murder Of The Italian Lady (CC 7/1992 - Public Prosecutor v Maksa bin Tohaiee) (See: Murder of Clementina Curci)
- 9. (21 October 2003): Found Insane (Public Prosecutor v Neo Man Lee)
- 10. (28 October 2003): Child Raped (CC 29/2002 - Public Prosecutor v Peh Thian Hui and Another) (see: Peh Thian Hui case)
- 11. (4 November 2003): Jealousy Knows No Limit (CC 36/1985 - Public Prosecutor v Vasavan Sathiadew and Others) (See: Murder of Frankie Tan)
- 12. (11 November 2003): The Male Woman (CC 6/1993 - Public Prosecutor v Chin Seow Noi and Others) (See: Murder of Lim Lee Tin)
- 13. (18 November 2003): The Story Of Koh Swee Beng (CC 1/1989 - Public Prosecutor v Koh Swee Beng) (See: Koh Swee Beng case)

=== Season 3 (Mondays, 10.00 p.m.) ===
- 1. (25 October 2004): The Pulau Senang Trial (Public Prosecutor v Tan Kheng Ann and Others) (see also: Pulau Senang prison riots)
- 2. (1 November 2004): Rich Man, Poor Man (Public Prosecutor v Tan Freddy)
- 3. (8 November 2004): The Fiancée's Father (Public Prosecutor v N Govindasamy) (See: Murder of Mohamed Azad)
- 4. (15 November 2004): The Trial of Father Joachim Kang (Public Prosecutor v Kang Hock Chai Joachim)
- 5. (22 November 2004): Killed By His Mother's Lover (Public Prosecutor v Chong Keng-Chye) (see: 1999 Ang Mo Kio child abuse case)
- 6. (29 November 2004): Death On Pulau Ubin (Public Prosecutor v Harun bin Ripin and Another, Mohamed Yasin bin Hussin v Public Prosecutor [1976] SGPC 2)
- 7. (6 December 2004): The Tooth Fragment (Public Prosecutor v Nadasan Chandra Secharan [1996] SGHC 228, Nadasan Chandra Secharan v Public Prosecutor [1997] SGCA 3) (See: Death of Ramapiram Kannickaisparry)
- 8. (13 December 2004): The Moving Mini Murder (Public Prosecutor v Lee Chor Pet and Others) (See also: Kidnapping of Ong Beang Leck)
- 9. (20 December 2004): Girl Thrown To Her Death (Public Prosecutor v Neville Hensley Anthony) (see also: Kallang Bahru rape and murder)
- 10. (27 December 2004): Rage (Public Prosecutor v Jimmy Chua Hwa Soon [1998] SGHC 16) (See: 1996 Bedok Reservoir flat murder)
- 11. (3 January 2005): Fatal Step (Public Prosecutor v Abdul Nasir bin Amer Hamsah [1996] SGHC 138, Public Prosecutor v Abdul Nasir bin Amer Hamsah (1997)) (See: Oriental Hotel Murder)
- 12. (10 January 2005): Unsolved (Geylang Bahru Family Murders)

=== Season 4 (Sundays 10.00 p.m.) ===
- 1. (2 April 2006): The Bukit Merah Maid Trial (CC 19/2003 - Public Prosecutor v Sundarti Supriyanto) (See: Sundarti Supriyanto)
- 2. (9 April 2006): Serial Rapist (CC 39/2003 - Public Prosecutor v Suresh Nair)
- 3. (16 April 2006): Itch To Kill (CC 22/1996 - Public Prosecutor v Ong Teng Siew) (See: Murder of Ng Gee Seh)
- 4. (23 April 2006): Baby Killer (CC 15/2003 - Public Prosecutor v Soosainathan s/o Dass Saminathan) (see: Anjeli Elisaputri rape and murder)
- 5. (30 April 2006): Bungled Burglary (CC 12/1991 - Public Prosecutor v Tan Chee Hwee and Another, CCA 14/1992 - Tan Chee Hwee and Another v Public Prosecutor)
- 6. (7 May 2006): Headless Corpse (Public Prosecutor v Abdul Based Late Nasin Uddin)
- 7. (14 May 2006): Murder of the Caretaker (CC 8/2004 - Public Prosecutor v Zailani bin Ahmad) (See also: Murder of Chi Tue Tiong)
- 8. (21 May 2006): Deaf Mute Dead (CC 3/2003 - Public Prosecutor v Tan Chun Seng, CA/CCA 2/2003 - Tan Chun Seng v Public Prosecutor)
- 9. (28 May 2006): Transvestite Killed (CC 54/1991 - Public Prosecutor v Soosay a/l Sinnappen) (See: Johore Road transvestite murder)
- 10. (4 June 2006): Death in the Bath (Suit 600211/2000 - Yap Chwee Khim v American Home Assurance Co and Others)
- 11. (11 June 2006): Fall Of Death (CC 6/2004 - Public Prosecutor v Lee Harith Gary (alias Lee Cheng Thiam)) (See: Murder of Diana Teo Siew Peng)
- 12. (18 June 2006): Car Boot Murder (CC 35/2004 - Public Prosecutor v Lim Poh Lye and Another) (See: Murder of Bock Tuan Thong)
- 13. (25 June 2006): Mistaken (CC 12/2002 - Public Prosecutor v Fazely bin Rahmat and Another) (See: Murder of Sulaiman bin Hashim)

=== Season 5 (Sundays, 10.00 p.m. (Monday for fifth episode) ===
- 1. (7 January 2007): The Peeping Tom Trial (Public Prosecutor v Ho Joon Toh)
- 2. (14 January 2007): Murder by Car (Public Prosecutor v Tan Cheng Eng William)
- 3. (21 January 2007): Gun Siege (Public Prosecutor v Teo Cheng Leong) (See also: Teo Cheng Leong)
- 4. (28 January 2007): Death At 13 (Public Prosecutor v Lim Seng Chuan)
- 5. (5 February 2007): Strangled by Sari (CC 58/2002 - Public Prosecutor v Saminathan s/o Subramaniam)
- 6. (11 February 2007): The Orchard Towers Double Murder (CC 17/2006 - Public Prosecutor v McCrea Michael) (See also: Orchard Towers double murders)
- 7. (25 February 2007): Thai Pimp Killed (Public Prosecutor v Singngoi Somsak)
- 8. (4 March 2007): The Shenton Way Shootout (CC 33/2004 - Public Prosecutor v Khor Kok Soon) (See also: Khor Kok Soon)
- 9. (11 March 2007): Morbid Jealousy (CC 8/2005 - Public Prosecutor v G Krishnasamy Naidu) (See also: Murder of Chitrabathy Narayanasamy)
- 10. (18 March 2007): The Maid (CC 31/2004 - Public Prosecutor v Purwanti Parji) (See also: Purwanti Parji case)

== Trivia ==
- The legal consultant for Seasons 1 and 2 is Senior Counsel R Palakrishnan. After Palakrishnan died in July 2003, the same year as Season 2's first telecast, Subhas Anandan becomes the new legal consultant for this docu-drama from Season 3 onwards, which first aired in the following year (2004).
- The closing credits for Seasons 1 and 2 flipped from page to page on a black screen, accompanied by random music. In Season 3, the closing credits scrolled from bottom-to-top in a red background similar to a scene in the opening sequence, featuring the allegory of justice found at the entrance of the old Supreme Court building in Singapore; as well as accompaniment by only the opening theme music. This background and music continued to be used for closing credits in Seasons 4 and 5, except that the credits flipped from page to page as per Seasons 1 and 2.
- The front gate of Changi Prison, despite appearing in the opening sequence throughout the first season (and the opening sequence would remain unchanged throughout the entire telecast), only appeared as a background in one of the last episodes for that season, The Burnt Body Case, when the date of execution for that accused was revealed near to the end of the episode. This background would continue to be used at the end of most episodes in Seasons 2 and 3, either revealing the date of execution or the verdict for the accused, or any important information or records (such as in The Story Of Koh Swee Beng, it mentioned about the number of prisoners on Death Row being pardoned by the President of Singapore over a period of time). It was last used in Fatal Step, the second last episode of Season 3 and the last episode in that season to feature a High Court case (due to the following and last episode, The Unsolved, being a special, did not feature any High Court case as the murderers were never found).
