= Murder of Clementina Curci =

1990 robbery-murder of an Italian housewife in Singapore

- Date: 10 October 1990
- Location: Bo Seng Avenue, Singapore
- Motive: Robbery
- Deaths: Clementina Curci Di Girolamo, 38
- Convicted: Maksa bin Tohaiee, 18
- Sentence: Death penalty

Maksa bin Tohaiee, the 18-year-old cleaner charged with Clementina Curci's murder

On 10 October 1990, just three days after her whole family migrated from Italy to Singapore, 38-year-old Italian housewife Clementina Curci Di Girolamo, also known as Clementina Curci, was brutally murdered by an intruder inside her new house at Bo Seng Avenue. After she was strangled and became unconscious, Curci's naked body was immersed in a bathtub full of water, resulting in her death due to both drowning and strangulation. Police also established that several items had been stolen from the house, and the hired cleaners of the house stated they never noticed anything amiss while working outside the house.

A month after the police's first stage of investigations, an 18-year-old cleaner named Maksa bin Tohaiee, a Singaporean, who was part of the cleaning team hired by Curci's family to clean the house and the sole member absent at the time of her murder, was arrested and charged with murder, and Maksa confessed to having sneaked into the house to steal items and strangled Curci before killing her. Although Maksa later attempted to retract his confession and raised an alibi defence during his trial, he was found guilty of murder and sentenced to death on 25 November 1992, and a year later, Maksa was executed by hanging at Changi Prison on 26 November 1993.

== Death and investigations ==
On the afternoon of 10 October 1990, Philips Singapore executive Franco Di Girolamo, an Italian expatriate, came back home for lunch at his family's new bungalow house around Bo Seng Avenue, and as he arrived home, Do Girolamo noticed the items inside the house were in full disarray and tried to look for his wife, but to no avail. Subsequently, inside the bathroom of his daughter's bedroom, much to the shock and grief of Di Girolamo, his 38-year-old wife Clementina Curci Di Girolamo was discovered dead, with her nude body immersed inside a bathtub full of water. Like her husband, Curci first migrated from Italy to Singapore on 7 October 1990 (three days before her death) with her daughter and son to live with her husband, who was transferred from the Netherlands to his company's branch in Singapore in August 1990. She was last seen alive by her husband when she took her two children to school on a taxi at around 7am.

According to the forensic pathologist Clarence Tan, the cause of death was due to both strangulation and drowning. In his report, Dr Tan said that Curci was in a state of asphyxia due to the strangulation and it alone would have led to her death, but the subsequent immersion of water escalated her death within a short period of time. There were signs of injuries and bruises on the neck and face, which supported the possibility that Curci was strangled, and the water inside her lungs also supported the fact of her having drowned. Dr Tan also confirmed there were no signs of sexual assault on the victim. The time of death was fixed at between 7am and 9am on 10 October.

Police were contacted and they began investigating the death of Curci, which they classified as murder. A handbag and two black wallets containing S$200 in cash were found to be missing during the search in the house. At the time of the murder, a group of hired cleaners, led by Lim Kok Poo, were outside the house cleaning the bungalow while the killing took place indoors, and this was their third day of work at the bungalow since the Di Girolamo family hired them. Three members (including Lim) of the hired cleaning group were questioned but none of them stated they heard or see anything amiss when they arrived at the bungalow to start their work. The fourth and final member, 18-year-old Maksa bin Tohaiee, was absent from work at the time of the murder, but nonetheless, Maksa was considered as a suspect behind the murder.

Maksa was brought in for questioning at the CID, but he denied being at the house at the time of the murder and claimed that he was absent on sick leave that same day. After 48 hours of questioning, Maksa was released from the police station.

== Maksa's arrest and confession ==
A month later, on 10 November 1990, Maksa was brought back into police custody a second time for further questioning.

By this time, Maksa's 18-year-old girlfriend Rosidah told police during questioning that shortly after his release from the CID, Maksa had given her a black wallet and Brazilian currency notes, telling her to sell the wallet and convert the foreign cash (which were worth around S$460 in total) to SGD as he stole them from the Di Girolamo family's new house. With this new information, Maksa was summoned back to CID, and he readily admitted during questioning that he indeed stole items from the bungalow, starting from the first day he arrived to clean the house. He led the police to a manhole in Ang Mo Kio where he claimed to have disposed of the brown handbag, but the handbag could not be recovered. Maksa also brought the police to his brother's flat, where they found one of the stolen wallets inside his brother's kitchen. A gold ring, two watches and two US$1 notes that belonged to the Di Girolamo family were also recovered.

Maksa also stated that on the day of the murder, the same day he was supposedly absent on medical leave, he actually trespassed the bungalow house from behind through the back window, and went in to steal more items after leaving his flat at around 7.30am. It was at this point Maksa finally admitted he killed Curci on that day, and he claimed he was panicked when he was caught red-handed by the victim, whom he restrained and strangled by an arm lock by slinging one of his arms around Curci's neck, while she was struggling and trying to defend herself (it led to Maksa being bitten on the finger during the scuffle). Later, when Curci fell unconscious, Maksa, who thought that Curci had died, dragged the body into the bathroom of Curci's daughter's bedroom, where he placed the whole body inside a bathtub filled with water before he fled the house. Maksa also told police he only intended to commit robbery but not murder. Maksa even demonstrated how he restrained the victim to Inspector Ng Chee Kok, Sergeant Tay Hock Lai and a Corporal Low when re-enacting the crime.

Since Maksa had effectively confessed to the murder, he was officially placed under arrest and he was charged with murder two days later on 12 November 1990, and subsequently remanded for investigations. Given the fact that Maksa was 18 years old when he committed murder, he would receive the death penalty if convicted as charged, since the law allows judges to pass the death sentence on capital offenders who were aged 18 years and above when committing whichever capital crime. The case was later transferred from the district courts to the High Court in August 1991 for trial hearing on a later date.

== Death penalty trial ==
On 29 October 1992, 20-year-old Maksa bin Tohaiee stood trial at the High Court for the murder of 38-year-old Clementina Curci. Maksa was represented by defence lawyers Ronald Ng and Luke Lee, while the trial prosecutor was Deputy Public Prosecutor (DPP) Errol Foenander. Judicial Commissioner (JC) Amarjeet Singh was the presiding judge of the case.

Despite his confession to the police, Maksa firmly denied that he committed the crime. His defence counsel argued that Maksa was assaulted during interrogation by Inspector Ng Chee Kok and that he was forced to admit to the crime and sign the confession under Inspector Ng's coercion. After a trial within a trial however, JC Singh accepted that the signed confession Maksa gave to the police should be admitted as evidence.

On 19 November 1992, Maksa was called to give his defence. Maksa continued to maintain on the stand that he was innocent and that he had an alibi at the time he supposedly killed Curci. He stated that on 10 October 1990, the day of the murder, he was resting at his older brother Shaari's flat as he was sick. He woke up at around 8am at his mother's Ang Mo Kio flat on the sixth floor, where he lived with his mother and two elder sisters. He stated that he went up to the seventh floor, where his brother lived in one of the units, and rested at his brother's living room for two hours before his brother persuaded him to go to the clinic, which was 15 minutes away from his flat, and that he never left the clinic while he was waiting for his turn to consult Dr Winston Ee, the clinic doctor who verified that he indeed saw Maksa at around that timing. He ended his testimony by stating he returned home at 11am. Maksa's family members, including his mother Yam binte Md Kasa, his eldest sister Khatijah, his second eldest sister Jalilah, his elder brother Shaari and his sister-in-law Azizah (Shaari's wife), were all summoned to court to give their testimonies to support Maksa's alibi defence.

However, the testimonies of the witnesses were all riddled with inconsistencies and uncertainties. Maksa's mother claimed that she saw her son at her flat at around 8.45am before he left the flat to visit the clinic, and yet Maksa's sister-in-law stated she saw Maksa resting at the living room of her husband's flat at the same timing of around 8am or near to 9am. Maksa's brother flatly stated he could not remember if he indeed saw Maksa that morning. Maksa's elder sister, who initially stated she never saw Maksa at home between 7am and 10am during police questioning, changed her story in court and claimed she saw Maksa at home around 8am and also seen him leaving the flat while she was taking care of and feeding her newborn child.

In rebuttal, DPP Foenander, who based the prosecution's case mostly on Maksa's confession, argued that the alibi defence raised by Maksa was weak and should not be relied on, given that there were inconsistent details and uncertainties on the true whereabouts of Maksa during the time frame when Curci was murdered. He stated that the witnesses were all family members directly or indirectly related to Maksa and they should be regarded as witnesses who had his interests at heart and may have concocted evidence to his advantage, and based on the time of Curci's death and the time Maksa left the house (which was actually 7.30am), Maksa had more than ample time to commit the murder and burglary before seeing the doctor. For this, DPP Foenander argued that Maksa was indeed at the scene of crime on the day of the murder and he should be convicted of murder.

On 25 November 1992, Judicial Commissioner Amarjeet Singh found Maksa guilty of murder after rejecting his "unsatisfactory" alibi defence and determining that he indeed was at the scene of crime and had murdered Curci in the course of committing burglary. Therefore, 20-year-old Maksa bin Tohaiee was sentenced to death upon his conviction for murder, since the death penalty was the mandatory sentence for murder under Singapore law.

== Execution ==
After Maksa was sentenced to death, he engaged another lawyer John Abraham to appeal to the Court of Appeal on his behalf, but he failed to overturn the death sentence and conviction as the three judges - Chief Justice Yong Pung How, and two Judges of Appeal L P Thean and Chao Hick Tin - unanimously rejected his appeal. Maksa's appeal to the President of Singapore for clemency was also dismissed.

In the aftermath, Singapore crime show True Files re-enact the case of Clementina Curci's murder and the re-enactment first aired on 14 October 2003 as the eighth episode of the show's second season. According to prison statistics released in the True Files episode, it was confirmed that Maksa bin Tohaiee was hanged at Changi Prison on 26 November 1993 for murdering 38-year-old Clementina Curci. Maksa was 21 years old at the time of his execution.

== See also ==
- Capital punishment in Singapore
