= M. G. G. Pillai =

Malaysian journalist

M. G. G. Pillai (1939 – 28 April 2006) was a Malaysian journalist and political activist. He was one of the country's pioneers in Internet-based journalism and activism. His parents were immigrants from Kerala, India. His great maternal uncle, Thakazhi Sivasankara Pillai was a celebrated Malayalam novelist. True to the matrilineal tradition of the Nair caste, he had a reverential relationship with Thakazhi. Thakazhi in turn was proud of his nephew's journalistic pursuits. M. G. G. Pillai was married to P.C. Jayasree. They have two sons, Sreekant Pillai and Sreejit Pillai.

== Background and career ==
A Johor Bahru-born Malaysian Indian of Malayalee descent, he studied in English College Johore Bahru, and later studied law at the University of Singapore. He started his career in journalism in the 1960s as a Reuters correspondent, and covered the Vietnam War in 1965. In 1967, Pillai had a brief stint in Bernama before joining the Malay Mail and covered the 13 May riots for the newspaper in 1969. He joined the then newly established Singapore Herald in 1970 but left after the government of Singapore refused to renew his work permit.

Upon returning to Malaysia, Pillai began freelancing for the Far Eastern Economic Review (FEER). By then, Pillai was also a stringer for the Indian newspaper Hindustan Times. Besides writing for FEER, Pillai also contributed to Newsweek as a stringer and co-founded the defunct news magazine Asiaweek. In 1977, Pillai became the first Malaysian to receive a fellowship from the Nieman Foundation for Journalism, which offered him a chance for further study in journalism at Harvard University.

== Journalistic style ==
Pillai was well known for his straight-talking, no-holds-barred style of reporting and commentary, which resulted in brushes with authority. He had been forbidden from entering Singapore since 1990 after one of his reports roused the anger of top government officials. While politicians may have reviled him in public for his hard-hitting, anti-establishment views, privately many maintained good personal relations with Pillai, to the extent he became a confidant to politicians in both the government and the opposition.

== Contribution to Malaysian journalism ==
Pillai was a regular contributor to pro-opposition publications, such as the official mouthpiece of the Pan-Malaysian Islamic Party (PAS), Harakah, independent online news and commentary portals Malaysia Today and Malaysiakini. He was one of the first Malaysian journalists to see the potential of the internet; he founded a mailing list-based current affairs discussion forum, Sang Kancil ("The Mouse Deer") and mggpillai.com, his self-titled but now-defunct news and commentary website. He rose to national prominence during the heyday of the Reformasi ("Reform") movement, which blossomed following the sacking of the then Deputy Prime Minister Datuk Seri Anwar Ibrahim in 1998. His internet-based commentaries and reporting were at the forefront in chronicling the political turmoil amid a time when the internet was in its infancy in Malaysia.

== Death ==
Pillai died on 28 April 2006 at the University of Malaya Medical Centre, Kuala Lumpur, due to heart-related complications.
