= Lin Hengnan =

Chinese-Malay publisher (fl. 1800s)

Lin Hengnan, also known as Lim Kong Chuan, was the owner of Koh Yew Hean Press and the publisher of Sing Po.

== Early life ==
Lin was born in Kinmen.

== Career ==
He arrived in Singapore in 1861 and founded Koh Yew Hean Press. He published a Chinese-Malay dictionary, the Tong Yi Xin Yu, in 1877. Due to its popularity, the dictionary was reprinted in 1883 under the title of Hua Yi Tong Yu.

He began printing the Chinese-language newspaper Sing Po in 1890.

== Personal life ==
He had a son.
