= Geylang Bahru family murders =

Unsolved Singaporean murder case

- Geylang Bahru family murder victims: Top (from left): Kok Peng (age 10), Kok Hin (age 8); Bottom (from left): Kok Soon (age 6), Chin Nee (age 5)
- Location: Block 58, Geylang Bahru, Singapore
- Date: 6 January 1979
- Target: Tan children (4 people)
- Attack type: Mass murder, Mass stabbing
- Weapons: Possibly a cleaver and a dagger
- Deaths: 4
- Victims: Kok Peng, 10; Kok Hin, 8; Kok Soon, 6; Chin Nee, 5
- Perpetrator: Unknown

The Geylang Bahru family murders occurred in Singapore on 6 January 1979. All four children in the Tan family were found dead in their flat, at Block 58 Geylang Bahru. They were hacked, stabbed and slashed to death and their bodies were left piled on top of each other. The children ranged from 5 to 10 years of age at the time of death. Their parents, Tan Kuen Chai (Chinese: 陳昆才; pinyin: Chén Kūncái) and Lee Mei Ying (李美英; Lí Měiyīng), were working at the time of the murders. The police interviewed over a hundred people who were possible suspects. However, the case remains unsolved.

== Murders ==
At 6:35 AM, Tan and Lee left for work. They operated a minibus service that transported students to school. Their children, Tan Kok Peng (陳國平; Chén Guópíng), 10, Tan Kok Hin (陳國興; Chén Guóxīng), 8, Tan Kok Soon (陳國順; Chén Guóshùn), 6, and Tan Chin Nee (陳珍妮; Chén Zhēnnī), 5, were still asleep at the time. The older three, all boys, were students at Bendemeer Road Primary School, while their younger sister attended a nearby People's Association kindergarten.

At 7:10 AM, their mother phoned them three times to wake them up but received no answer. She proceeded to ask a neighbour to help wake the children. The neighbour knocked on the door, but also received no reply.

When the couple returned home after 10:00 AM, Lee found the bodies of her children in the bathroom. They had been left piled on top of each other in their t-shirts and underwear, with slash wounds on their heads. The right arm of Kok Peng, the oldest child, had been almost severed, while Chin Nee, the youngest child, had slash wounds on her face. The children were reported to have at least 20 slash wounds each.

== Investigation ==
The police concluded that the murders were premeditated and that the killer(s) had taken care to avoid leaving evidence. However, there were bloodstains in the kitchen sink and the killer(s) appeared to have cleaned themselves before leaving the flat. There was no evidence of forced entry because the flat had not been ransacked and no items were reported missing. The murder weapons, believed to have been a cleaver and a dagger, were never found. The eldest son, Kok Peng, is believed to have put up a fight with the killer, as several strands of long hair were found in his right hand.

The investigation was conducted by the Criminal Investigation Department's Special Investigation Section. They were unable to identify a motive but suggested that the murders were motivated by vengeance.

The police also believed that the perpetrator(s) had personal knowledge of the Tans and their circumstances, as they were seemingly aware that Lee had undergone sterilisation after the birth of her last child. Two weeks after the murder, the Tans received a Chinese New Year card depicting happy children playing together with the words "Now you can have no more offspring, ha-ha-ha" in Chinese. It was signed "the murderer". The sender(s) additionally addressed the parents by their nicknames, "Ah Chai" and "Ah Eng", further suggesting that it was someone related or familiar to the family.

== Aftermath ==
The children were buried on 7 January 1979 at Choa Chu Kang Cemetery, along with some of their belongings. Their parents subsequently ceased their minibus business and started working at a company that produced PVC materials. Lee managed to reverse the sterilisation that she had undergone prior to the murder, and gave birth to a healthy baby boy in December 1983, nearly five years after the incident. The couple later had a daughter.

In 2004, True Files, a Singaporean crime show, re-enacted the murders of the Tan children and the adaptation was aired as the final episode of the show's third season.

In 2021, Shin Min Daily News revealed that Tan Kuen Chai died a number of years before, and Lee Mei Ying was still alive in her 70s, living with her grandson. There was also new information received from an old neighbour's tip-off, which revived the investigation of the case.

A 2022 crime show Inside Crime Scene re-enacted the Geylang Bahru child murders and aired the adaptation as its second episode.

== See also ==
- Crime in Singapore
- List of unsolved murders (1900–1979)
