= Tabla! =

English language newspaper in Singapore

tabla!
- Type: Free weekly newspaper
- Format: Compact / Tabloid
- Owner: SPH Media
- Publisher: Tamil Murasu
- Founded: 10 October 2008; 17 years ago
- Language: English
- Headquarters: Singapore
- Circulation: 30,000
- Website: www.tabla.com.sg

tabla! is a weekly English language newspaper in Singapore, published by Tamil Murasu. Launched on 10 October 2008, it marked its third anniversary in October 2011 with the launch of the tabla! Community Champion Award. tabla! also presented the Taj Express, a Bollywood musical that made its world premiere here in Singapore, on June 7.

The paper is named after the popular two-piece Indian percussion instrument, tabla. 30,000 free copies of the newspaper are distributed every Friday, excluding public holidays. It is available at all 7-Eleven outlets in Singapore. It provides local news to the Singaporean-Indian community (and PRs) and includes stories on education, property and transport.

== See also ==
- List of newspapers in Singapore
