= Murder of Chi Tue Tiong =

2003 murder of a caretaker in a Geylang apartment

Chi Tue Tiong
- Born: Chi Tue Tiong; 1935; China
- Died: 28 June 2003 (aged 68); Geylang, Singapore
- Cause of death: Murdered
- Other names: Ah Tiong; Ah Pek
- Occupation: Caretaker
- Employer: Tan Poh Geat
- Known for: Murder victim
- Children: 3+

On 28 June 2003, 68-year-old Chi Tue Tiong (徐亚畅 Xú Yàchàng), a caretaker of one of the rental apartments in Geylang, was murdered by a couple who rented one of the rooms of the apartment. Chi, who had been bludgeoned on the head at least nine times, died as a result of brain injuries and extensive skull fractures. The police managed to trace the two suspects, but only the male assailant, 35-year-old Zailani bin Ahmad, was arrested and charged with murder, because the second suspect, who was Zailani's Indonesian girlfriend, had fled from Singapore to Batam and was not extradited to stand trial. Zailani, who argued that he suffered diminished responsibility and had killed Chi under the influence of sleeping pills, was found guilty of murder and sentenced to death in March 2004.

== Discovery of murder ==
On the Saturday afternoon of 28 June 2003, 68-year-old Tan Poh Geat arrived at apartment 39B in one of the areas of Geylang (Singapore's red-light district), looking for the apartment's caretaker, 68-year-old Chi Tue Tiong, whom she employed as a caretaker of both apartments 39B and 37C. Tan, who had not seen Chi for the whole morning and afternoon, suspected that something was amiss because Chi normally would not miss both his lunch and afternoon snack. By the time Tan arrived, she was unable to enter the apartment and found that the key was missing.

Tan managed to seek help from other people to open the gate, and upon entry, they discovered the corpse of Chi Tue Tiong lying in a pool of blood inside his room. Chi was found to have multiple injuries on his head and arms, and his drawers were tampered with, and most of the room's interior space was covered with blood. After the police were contacted, they inspected the area and found bloodstained shoeprints on the floor. A bloodstained wooden pestle was also found in one of the drawers inside Chi's bedroom, and it was speculated that the pestle was used by Chi's killer(s) to commit his murder. Chi, a Singaporean of Hakka Chinese descent, was survived by at least three children, including a daughter who rushed back to Singapore from Johor upon hearing the news of her father's death. It was reported that no one heard anything unusual on the day when Chi was killed.

Dr Teo Eng Swee, a forensic pathologist who performed an autopsy on the victim, discovered extensive skull fractures and brain injuries, which were caused by multiple blunt force trauma. Dr Teo determined that at least nine blows were inflicted to Chi's head with a blunt instrument, and the murder weapon was possibly either the bloodstained wooden pestle or the handle of an axe found at the scene. He also stated that based on the blood splatters on Chi's bed, he was likely first assaulted on the bed before he was continually assaulted while lying on the floor. He stated that the death of Chi likely took place about eight to sixteen hours prior, and the injuries were so severe that they resulted in death within minutes.

== Investigations ==
The police classified the case of Chi Tue Tiong's death as murder, and they promptly began their investigations in the case, with Inspector David Ang leading the investigations. They found that the pestle belonged to Itsariya Jinakarn, a Thai masseuse who rented a room in apartment 37C, and she told the police that her pestle was a part of the set of a pounder and pestle that she kept in the kitchen area of apartment 37C, and she stated that it was often borrowed by an Indonesian couple, who rented one of the rooms in the same apartment as her before they moved out on the same day the caretaker was murdered.

The police therefore focused their investigation on the couple. They identified the female ex-tenant, who was an Indonesian citizen who left for Batam by ferry on 29 June 2003, a day after Chi was killed. The Indonesian woman, whose name was Rachel (alias Fatimah or Leni), was approached by the officers of the Singapore Police Force, who were dispatched to Indonesia to interview her. Rachel provided the police some crucial information, which led police to a flat in Telok Blangah. The resident of the flat, Supiah bte Awang, told police that on the day of the murder, Rachel and her boyfriend, identified as Zailani bin Ahmad, came to visit her husband, Kassim bin Rabu, who was Zailani's friend, but Kassim was not at home. Supiah said that after the couple rested at her flat for a while, Zailani borrowed a pair of shoes from her while leaving his own bag and shoes inside the flat. Zailani's shoes and bag were recovered by the police, and the shoes were found to have bloodstains on them, and the DNA profile matched that of the murdered caretaker. Furthermore, the bloodstained shoeprints found at the crime scene matched the print of Zailani's shoes.

On 30 June 2003, after 40 hours of police investigation, Zailani (who spent the past two days hiding in three different places) was arrested as a suspect for murdering Chi Tue Tiong. Investigations by the police concluded that Zailani and Rachel were both responsible for killing Chi Tue Tiong during a robbery bid. Background information revealed that prior to the murder, Zailani, who was a Singaporean citizen and was 35 years old at the time of his arrest, was working as an air-conditioner technician, and he also engaged in selling illegal VCDs to supplement his income. Zailani was also a divorcee with one son, and he graduated from secondary school with a GCE N-level certificate. He also had previously spent time at drug rehabilitation centres on several occasions for drug abuse.

On 1 July 2003, just three days after the caretaker's murder, 35-year-old Zailani bin Ahmad was charged with murder. Rachel was also charged in absentia for the murder of the caretaker, but even though she was mentioned alongside Zailani in the charge sheet, Rachel was never brought back to Singapore for indictment and trial because there was no extradition treaty between Indonesia and Singapore, and Rachel herself made clear her intention to not return to Singapore to assist in investigations. Therefore, only Zailani was charged in court for the murder, and he was also the sole person left pending trial for the case.

== Trial of Zailani Ahmad ==
=== Proceedings ===
On 1 March 2004, Zailani bin Ahmad stood trial at the High Court for one count of murdering Chi Tue Tiong. The prosecution was led by Han Ming Kuang and Deborah Tan, while Zailani's defence counsel was led by Ismail Hamid. Justice Kan Ting Chiu was the presiding judge of Zailani's murder trial.

Dr Teo Eng Swee was one of the prosecution's witnesses (which also included the tenants of the caretaker's apartment). Dr Teo, who testified in court and presented his medical report, responded to the prosecution's inquiries that the assault that took Chi's life was unlikely to be a frenzied attack caused by someone who was not himself at the time, since the nature of the injuries were not haphazard and most of the injuries were concentrated at the head, which was a vital part of the body, suggesting that the blows that struck the deceased were deliberately directed towards his head by either the defendant or Rachel or both. Dr Teo nonetheless did not rule out the possibility of a frenzied attack when the defence cross-examined him. Another key witness was Dr John Heng, a general practitioner who was consulted by Zailani in relation to his insomnia. Dr Heng testified that less than a week before Zailani killed Chi, he prescribed to Zailani about 30 tablets of sleeping pills under the brand name "Dima." This was brought up due to Zailani putting up a defence that he suffered from diminished responsibility and killed Chi under the influence of a sleeping pill overdose.

Zailani's account to the police was that he did not have much money left in his possession, and he also lost his technician job. He was also unable to pay his rent, and was caught the day before for selling illegal VCDs before he was released on the day of the killing. Zailani's depression from these events led to him consuming twelve tablets of sleeping pills, six times the recommended daily intake which Dr Heng told him. Zailani stated that because of the desperation, he went along with Rachel's suggestion to steal money from Chi Tue Tiong. According to him in his confession, he used the wooden pestle to bludgeon the sleeping caretaker several times, resulting in Chi dying from the assault. He also said he attempted to open the drawer but was ultimately unsuccessful.

In court however, Zailani claimed that his statements to the police were not made voluntarily but made under threat. He also recanted parts of his account, adding that after he consumed the pills that same morning, he fell unconscious and the next thing he remembered was ransacking the drawers of Chi's room, with Rachel shaking him and telling him to look out for Chi, who went at them with a spanner after catching them red-handed. Zailani also said he could not remember if he had punched Chi or used the wooden pestle to hit Chi, although he conceded that he remembered wanting to steal from Chi some valuables. He added that after the assault, he lost his consciousness for the rest of the day, and lost his memory of some other events. He also pinned the blame of the murder on his girlfriend Rachel, who was still on the run in Indonesia as of the time Zailani's trial for murder was going on.

Dr Lim Yun Chin, a consultant psychiatrist of Raffles Hospital, testified to support Zailani's defence of diminished responsibility, stating that as a result of an overdose of sleeping pills, Zailani experienced paradoxical stimulant effects, which led to his behaviour becoming disorientated, disorganised, bizarre and unpredictable, and he also exhibited increased aggression and streaks of violence, which were demonstrated by Zailani violently attacking Chi while under the influence of these paradoxical stimulant effects. However, the prosecution's psychiatric expert, Dr Tommy Tan, who was a consultant psychiatrist from Woodbridge Hospital (later renamed the Institute of Mental Health), stated it was not possible for Zailani to be able to lose consciousness at one point before rapidly regaining it for a brief moment, then going back to a loss of consciousness, and he opined that Zailani was mentally normal, and fully aware of what he was doing at the time he murdered Chi Tue Tiong.

=== Verdict ===
Zailani bin Ahmad, who was sentenced to hang for the murder of Chi Tue Tiong

On 15 March 2004, after a trial lasting ten days, Justice Kan Ting Chiu delivered his verdict.

In his verdict, Justice Kan found that Zailani and Rachel shared a common intention to commit burglary, and they also armed themselves with the wooden pestle, which was used as the murder weapon to kill 68-year-old Chi Tue Tiong. He stated that based on their decision to arm themselves with a wooden pestle, the couple must have had the intention to cause grievous hurt if necessary, since they had the knowledge that the old man could recognize them if he either confronted them or they ran away before he discovered the burglary. He also stated that the fatal injuries were intentionally inflicted in furtherance of the pair's common intention to commit burglary, and even if it was Rachel who caused the fatal wounds in the present case, Zailani would still be held responsible for murder.

Also, Justice Kan rejected Zailani's defence of diminished responsibility, because he agreed with Dr Tommy Tan that Zailani was in full control of his faculties, and he referred to Zailani's selective memory and the multiple inconsistencies between his court account and police statements, determining that Zailani was a poor and unsatisfactory witness, and he also agreed with Dr Tan's contention that Zailani was prone to malingering. His actions, per Justice Kan's words, were not consistent with a person suffering from an abnormality of the mind, since he retained his awareness and consciousness of his actions and magnitude of the offence committed. He also accepted that the statements made by Zailani were given voluntarily.

As a result, 36-year-old Zailani bin Ahmad was found guilty of murder and sentenced to death. Under Section 302 of the Penal Code, the death penalty was mandated as the sole punishment for murder within the jurisdiction of Singapore.

== Aftermath ==
On 23 November 2004, Zailani's appeal was dismissed by the Court of Appeal's three judges - Chief Justice Yong Pung How, Justice M P H Rubin and Judge of Appeal Chao Hick Tin - who all agreed that Zailani was in full control of his faculties at the time he murdered Chi Tue Tiong. It was reported that after the loss of his appeal, Zailani shouted expletives at the judges before he was forcibly dragged out of court by officers who covered his mouth.

In the aftermath, True Files, a Singaporean crime show, re-enacted the Chi Tue Tiong murder case and aired it as the seventh episode of the show's fourth season on 14 May 2006. It was heavily implied that after the rejection of his appeal, Zailani had since been hanged for murdering Chi before the broadcast of the episode, although his date of execution was unknown. Ismail Hamid, who formerly represented Zailani, recounted that Zailani was stunned and shocked at the verdict of death during his trial, as Zailani believed throughout that his claims of having killed Chi under the influence of a sleeping pill overdose could be accepted by the trial court. It was also mentioned that Rachel, who remained at large in Indonesia, would also be executed alongside Zailani for Chi's murder should she be arrested and charged in court before her escape, but she has never been arrested or convicted for her role in the killing.

== See also ==
- Capital punishment in Singapore
