= Killing of Eva Soh =

1974 killing of a toddler girl in Singapore

On 26 August 1974, 22-month-old toddler Eva Soh Ai-Mei died of unnatural causes in her flat in Holland Road, Singapore. She had suffered from multiple injuries over the few weeks before her death, including a ruptured spleen and liver. Her family's maidservant, Ng Cha Boo, who was believed to have abused Eva, was charged with murder. Ng, initially convicted and sentenced to death, successfully appealed her sentence; her murder charge was reduced to culpable homicide and she was re-sentenced to six years' imprisonment.

== Death of Eva Soh ==
At about 2 pm on 26 August 1974, Ng called Eva's mother, Jane Soh. In the call, Ng sounded very frightened, saying that she was unable to wake Eva up. Jane then called her husband, Soh Tiang Keng, thereafter her sister, asking her sister to accompany her home. Tiang Keng returned home first, brought Eva to a nearby clinic. The clinic doctor examined Eva and found that her heartbeat and breathing were very faint, and advised Eva's father to bring her to the hospital immediately. Together with Jane and her sister, they brought her to Singapore General Hospital in a taxi, however she died of her injuries after arriving.

Forensic pathologist Dr Chao Tzee Cheng performed an autopsy and found that Eva had a ruptured spleen and two fractured ribs near the vertebral column on the right side. 400 millilitres of blood, equivalent to one-third of the total amount of blood in her body, was found in the abdominal cavity caused by the ruptured liver and spleen. Of particular concern was the ruptured liver and spleen, which was incurred about one hour before death, as according to Chao, the rupture could not have been caused by a fall from a small height or by resuscitation attempts, and the force required to cause such a rupture was equivalent to a fall from a great height or an impact in an accident.

Ng was only arrested several months later on 30 January 1975 after a coroner's inquiry was held, and evidence pointed towards Eva being a battered child.

== Trial ==
=== Initial trial and sentence ===
On 12 January 1976, Ng Cha Boo stood trial for the murder of Eva Soh. The prosecution was led by Deputy Public Prosecutor (DPP) Loh Lin Kok, while Ng was assigned defence lawyer K.E. Hilborne. The trial judges were Justice Alfred Victor Winslow and Justice Thilliampalam Kulasekaram.

Eva's mother, Jane, testified that on the evening of 14 August 1974, Eva was brought to Dr Jimmy How, her brother-in-law who was a medical officer in the Singapore Navy, who found a fresh bruise on Eva's right temple. Eva had gestured to her mother by saying 'pom-pom' (which was understood to mean she had a fall), knocking her hands against the wall, then pointing at Ng, implying that Ng had hit her against the wall. On the morning of 15 August, when Eva and her mother were sleeping, Eva rolled off her bed onto the floor. As Eva appeared to be restless, her mother brought her to see How again.

Dr Loh Tee Fun, a paediatrician and associate professor at the National University of Singapore, examined Eva on 24 August upon request by How for a second opinion on Eva's bruises, and found no issues other than a bruise on the left temporal region. When asked by Hilborne, Loh said that it was difficult to prove that this was a case of battered child syndrome. On the morning of 26 August, Eva's mother saw two new blue-black marks on Eva when she was bathing Eva. Eva also suddenly clung on to her mother tightly that morning as she was leaving for work, letting out a "very frightening" scream that her mother had never heard before.

The defence's arguments were based on the fact that there was no direct evidence that Ng had murdered Eva. Besides Ng and Eva, nobody would have known what happened in the Holland Road flat on the morning of 26 August. Ng denied having hurt Eva since the day she started taking care of her. She asserted that Eva had died due to complications resulting from falls on 11 August, when she slipped and fell in her room, and 15 August, when she rolled off her bed onto the floor. The defence also suggested that Eva's injuries could be caused by resuscitation attempts. This was rebutted by Chao Tzee Cheng, who said that while the spleen could be ruptured due to excessive force used in resuscitation attempts, the ribs were not, as common rib fractures resulting from cardiac resuscitation are seen in the left ribs, not the right ribs as in Eva's case.

On 30 January 1976, the trial judges found Ng guilty of the murder of Eva Soh, and sentenced her to death. In his judgement, Justice Winslow said they were satisfied beyond reasonable doubt that Ng had intentionally inflicted the injuries that ruptured Eva's liver and spleen and fractured her ribs. They acknowledged that this proved to be a challenging novel case, as the evidence against Ng was entirely circumstantial (which DPP Loh acknowledged) and was highly reliant on Chao's findings. Even then, they had no hesitation in rejecting Ng's versions of the events before Eva's death. They approached this case as one of murder as opposed to a classical one of a battered baby. At the time, she was the second woman in Singapore to face the death penalty, after Mimi Wong who murdered the wife of her Japanese lover in 1970.

=== Appeal ===
Ng appealed her death sentence. Ng was again represented by Hilborne, and the appeal was heard by Chief Justice Wee Chong Jin, Justice Frederick Arthur Chua and Justice Choor Singh.

Hilborne argued that Ng did not have the prerequisite intention to cause the death of Eva, and that no such intention was established in the initial trial. He added that Ng had accompanied Eva's parents to hospital on the day she died, and that there was no mental derangement on Ng's part as would be expected if she had committed murder.

On 9 September 1976, her appeal was successful; her murder charge was reduced to culpable homicide and she was re-sentenced to six years' imprisonment.

== Aftermath ==
On 7 May 2002, a Singaporean crime show True Files featured the case in the third episode of the show's first season.

The Eva Soh murder case was also one of the iconic cases solved by Professor Chao Tzee Cheng, the senior forensic pathologist. It was later re-enacted by the Singaporean crime show Whispers of the Dead in 2014. Both the perpetrator and victim had their names changed for dramatic purposes and to protect their identities, although the overall turn of events and trial proceedings remained reminiscent of the real life events.
