= Sing Po =

Chinese-language newspaper in Singapore

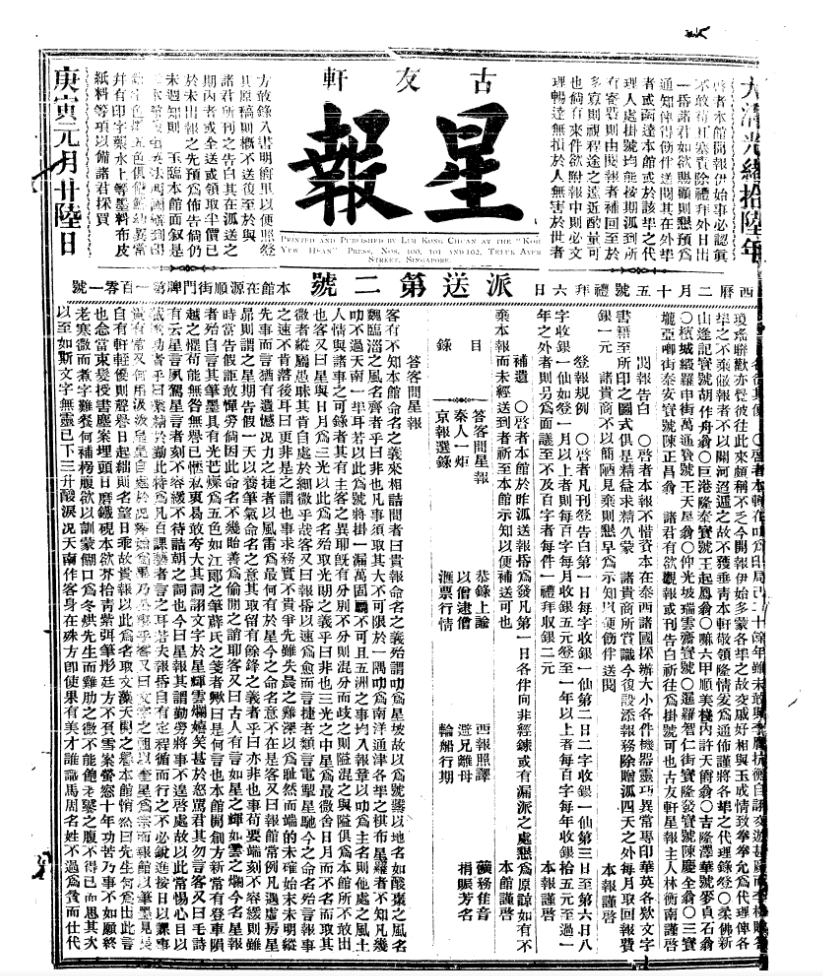
- Front page on 15 February 1890
- Format: Broadsheet
- Launched: 14 February 1890
- Ceased publication: 1898
- Language: Chinese
- Headquarters: Straits Settlements
- Country: Straits Settlements

Sing Po (Chinese: 星报, also known as the Xing Bao and Sing Pau), was a Chinese-language newspaper in Singapore. The newspaper was the second Chinese-language daily newspaper in Singapore, after Lat Pau. The newspaper closed down in 1898 was replaced by the Jit Shin Pao a year later.

== History ==
Sing Po was first published on 14 February 1890 by Koh Yew Hean Press as the second Chinese-language daily newspaper in Singapore. The paper was founded by Lin Hengnan, who was the proprietor of Koh Yew Hean Press, on No. 101, Telok Ayer Street. The paper was published daily, except on Sundays and public holidays. Issues of the newspaper were printed in red ink. Despite not having a political agenda, the paper had a pro-China political stance.

The editor of the newspaper was likely Lin and Huang Naishang was reported to have been a one-time editor and chief writer of the newspaper. At the newspaper's peak, it had a daily circulation of 970, which was higher than the daily circulation of Lat Pau, the paper's closest competitor. The paper frequently published articles asking for the government to solve the issues of prostitution, opium smoking and gambling.

The newspaper closed down in 1898, possibly due to mismanagement. It was replaced by the Jit Shin Pao a few months later in 1899 after restructuring.
