= Singapore Herald =

The Singapore Herald was a tabloid newspaper in Singapore whose publishing license was suspended by the Singapore government on 28 May 1971. The government had accused the paper of being involved in "black operations", of being funded by questionable foreign sources, of working up agitation against national policies and institutions and of "taking on the government".

== History ==
In 1974, the government strengthened press control through the Newspaper and Printing Presses Act. Its editors included M.G.G. Pillai and Adele Koh, who were both Malaysians. Koh later moved to Australia, becoming the second wife of Don Dunstan, the former Premier of South Australia.

== See also ==
- Censorship in Singapore
- List of newspapers in Singapore

== Sources ==
- Seow, Francis T. 1998. The Media Enthralled: Singapore Revisited. Boulder: Lynne Rienner. ISBN 1-55587-779-6
