= Murder of Chitrabathy Narayanasamy =

2004 high-profile killing of a woman by her husband in Singapore

Chitrabathy Narayanasamy
- Born: Chitrabathy d/o Narayanasamy; 18 April 1965; Singapore, Malaysia
- Died: 17 May 2004 (aged 39); Tuas, Singapore
- Cause of death: Murdered
- Other name: Chitra
- Occupation: Factory worker (former)
- Employer(s): Pelmac (?? – 1987); Sony (1993 – 2004)
- Known for: Murder victim
- Spouse: G. Krishnasamy Naidu
- Children: 2

On 17 May 2004, 39-year-old Chitrabathy Narayanasamy was murdered by her 43-year-old husband G. Krishnasamy Naidu, a taxi driver who was at the time released on bail for an earlier incident of stabbing his wife twice the month before her death. Krishnasamy, who surrendered himself nine hours after the killing, was charged with murdering Chitrabathy.

During his trial, which dragged on for a year since May 2005, Krishnasamy revealed that throughout the past two decades of his marriage with Chitrabathy, his wife had been involved in at least four extramarital affairs with other men, and just earlier in the same year he killed Chitrabathy, Krishnasamy once again suspected that his wife had another affair based on some uncorroborated circumstantial evidence he uncovered, and it manifested into his gradual violent behavior towards his wife and finally led to him murdering Chitrabathy by hacking her with a chopper several times outside her workplace.

It was further revealed that Krishnasamy was suffering from morbid jealousy, a delusional disorder that caused him to behave irrationally based on unfounded suspicions regarding his wife's infidelity and thus impaired his mental faculties at the time of the offence. Although Krishnasamy was sentenced to the mandatory death penalty after the High Court found him guilty of murder, the Court of Appeal unanimously allowed Krishnasamy's appeal and hence reduced his murder conviction to one of manslaughter, and commuted his death sentence to life in prison.

== Murder ==
=== Chopper attack ===
On 17 May 2004, 39-year-old Chitrabathy Narayanasamy, a worker of a Sony factory at Tuas, was hacked to death by her 42-year-old husband G Krishnasamy Naidu, who approached her on the pretext of signing divorce papers, but ambushed her with a chopper and killed her right in front of her colleagues outside her workplace.

The brutal attack itself left Chitrabathy with her head nearly decapitated. Krishnasamy left the scene afterwards. It was revealed that a month before, Krishnasamy was charged with stabbing his wife twice and he was out on bail for ten days at the time he killed his wife, with whom he had two children and another detail revealed Krishnasamy and Chitrabathy were married for twenty years when she was killed.

=== Indictment ===
Nine hours after the brutal murder, Krishnasamy surrendered himself to the police. It was reported that he had taunted his in-laws through a phone call that he murdered his wife and asked them to bury her, which brought shock to her kin, who all tried their best to protect Chitrabathy for the past ten days for fear of Krishnasamy coming after her while he was out on bail.

Krishnasamy, who celebrated his 43th birthday the day after murdering his wife, was charged with murder a day after his arrest.

== Trial of Krishnasamy ==
=== Prosecution's case ===
G. Krishnasamy Naidu
- Born: 18 May 1961 (age 65); Singapore
- Status: Incarcerated
- Convictions: Voluntarily causing grievous hurt (1 count; 2002); Manslaughter (1 count; 2006)
- Penalty: Three months' imprisonment (2002); Life imprisonment (2006)

Details
- Victims: 1
- Date: 2002, 8 April 2004, 17 May 2004
- Country: Singapore
- Date apprehended: 2002, 8 April 2004, 17 May 2004
- Imprisoned at: Changi Prison

For a single charge of murdering his wife, Krishnasamy stood trial at the High Court on 4 May 2005. The trial judge of the case was Woo Bih Li. Chong Kah Wei and Ng Cheng Thiam were both appointed as the trial prosecutors and Peter Keith Fernando represented Krishnasamy as his defence lawyer. It was the case at trial that Krishnasamy killed Chitrabathy for allegedly having an affair with another man, and that Chitrabathy had a history of being unfaithful to her husband, who threatened to kill her.

Krishnasamy's children, a son and daughter, both came to court as witnesses to testify against their father. They said that during the few months before the murder of their mother, their father had been conducting so-called family meetings on a regular basis, in which he had been violent and keep forcibly interrogating his wife for having an affair with another man, whose name was known to be Ashok. Ashok, whose real name was Asokan Muthu Suppiah, was a security guard from Chitrabathy's workplace and he was acquainted with Chitrabathy (whom he first met in February 2004) and sat on the same company bus with Chitrabathy on the way to work. According to the children, their mother repeatedly denied having an affair and it was on 8 April 2004, things got worse when an enraged Krishnasamy used a knife to stab Chitrabathy twice, which resulted in his arrest for voluntarily causing grievous hurt and subsequent threats to kill Chitrabathy. Krishnasamy's children reportedly expressed their anger and hatred against Krishnasamy for killing their mother and blamed him for their parents' marriage woes. Krishnasamy's daughter also publicly told the judge that she wanted her father to never come out of prison again and told the court how her mother was always taking care of them while their father was not around. Fernando recounted in an interview that his client was saddened to hear what his children had said in court.

Ashok, Chitrabathy's acquaintance who came to court as a witness, testified that he heard from Chitrabathy that Krishnasamy threatened to kill her and she was fearful of her husband, and evidence also showed that Krishnasamy had tried to look for Ashok at his workplace hours before he murdered his wife. Chitrabathy's sister, who helped her to make a police report on Krishnasamy, said that when Krishnasamy called her to tell her he killed her sister, Krishnasamy threatened to murder her next after killing his wife, an allegation which Krishnasamy denied.

=== Krishnasamy's account ===
Krishnasamy went to the stand to give his evidence. It was on the stand where he gave a lengthy account about his marriage with Chitrabathy, her past affairs and his eventual plot to kill Chitrabathy.

==== 1987 ====
Krishnasamy said that through his parents' arrangement, he married Chitrabathy on 1 June 1985, and together, they bore a daughter in 1986 and a son in 1989. He recounted that the first time he discovered his wife's infidelity was one night in 1987, when he called her workplace to look for his wife, but he was told that she was on leave. Krishnasamy stayed up to wait for his wife to return home, and when she did, Chitrabathy replied to Krishnasamy's question that she was at work, which contradicted the truth that she was on leave. After Krishnasamy told his wife that her supervisor told him she was on leave, Chitrabathy thus explained she went to a friend's home at Block 5, Boon Lay. However, Krishnasamy, who initially believed Chitrabathy, discovered that there was no Block 5 in Boon Lay. Upon Krishnasamy's further questioning, Chitrabathy admitted she was having an affair with a man called Vel Murugan Perumal, a Malaysian colleague of her workplace at Pelmac. Murugan was later told off by Krishnasamy and asked to not talk to his wife again, and Murugan also admitted he had sex with Chitrabathy. Krishnasamy was disappointed and he originally wanted to divorce his wife, but his mother advised him to give her a second chance and Krishnasamy eventually forgave his wife out of love for her.

After which, Chitrabathy resigned from her job at Pelmac and she stayed at home to take care of their daughter, and later their son after his birth in 1989. Krishnasamy became the sole breadwinner by working as a tour bus driver, until he was retrenched in 1993 and became a taxi driver. Chitrabathy later went to work at a Sony factory to supplement the family's income. During this period until 2000, the couple's relationship was normal.

==== 2000 ====
In March 2000, Krishnasamy returned home one night and found that his son was sick, and thus he tried calling his wife (who was on her night shift) to help bring him to see a doctor. However, despite his numerous calls, Chitrabathy did not answer the phone and thus Krishnasamy personally bring his son to the clinic instead. Then, the next morning, Krishnasamy's call was taken by an engineer at the factory. He was informed that the factory was closed for nine days and all staff were told to go on leave, and the date when Krishnasamy called her workplace was the third day of closure, and it dawned upon Krishnasamy that Chitrabathy never gone to work. Subsequently, in the afternoon, when Chitrabathy returned home, Krishnasamy angrily told her that their son was sick and he tried calling her to no avail, and asked where she had been. Chitrabathy answered that she was on work, but Krishnasamy saw through her lie and informed her he knew about the factory's nine-day closure. Although Chitrabathy changed her reply and said she went to a friend's house, Krishnasamy was still furious and he therefore assaulted Chitrabathy, suspecting that she might have had an affair again.

Eventually, Krishnasamy found out that Chitrabathy had an affair with a man named Gunaseelan Jayaseelan and they also had sex on a few occasions. Jayaseelan was an Indian national who was also Chitrabathy's colleague. Also, it was discovered that Chitrabathy was eight weeks' pregnant and the child was more likely to be Jayaseelan's, because Krishnasamy never had sex with his wife for four to five months and he also noticed Chitrabathy did not go through a menstrual period (Indian women, by custom, do not make prayers when they were menstruating) and had made prayers for more than a month straight. After Chitrabathy confessed and asked for a second chance, Krishnasamy decided to forgo his intention to divorce Chitrabathy and forgave her on account of their children and he still loved Chitrabathy, and also paid for the abortion. Jayaseelan, who was told by Krishnasamy to not talk to his wife anymore, returned to India in October 2001.

==== 2001 – 2002 ====
In December 2001, Krishnasamy found out that Chitrabathy was having another affair with a man called Anan, who was an Indian national working at a flower shop nearby Krishnasamy's matrimonial home. Krishnasamy assaulted Chitrabathy with a bamboo pole regarding this, and Chitrabathy admitted to the affair after getting beaten by her husband. Still, Krishnasamy forgave his wife for the incident out of love for his wife.

Subsequently, in January 2002, after she ended the affair, Chitrabathy reported to the police that Krishnasamy had assaulted her on three occasions, although she never admit to the police at first that she was assaulted over her past affairs. Krishnasamy, who was charged with three counts of voluntarily causing grievous hurt, pleaded guilty to one of the charges (the other two were taken into consideration during sentencing) and sentenced to three months' imprisonment on 25 March 2002, and Krishnasamy was released two months later after he was granted parole due to good behaviour. After which, the couple had a normal relationship.

Unknown to Krishnasamy, in 2003, Chitrabathy had a brief relationship with Michael Lee, a Malaysian colleague from her workplace, and she had sex with Lee a few times, and went to Genting Highlands with him at one point. Chitrabathy maintained contact with Lee through the year until she was killed by Krishnasamy.

==== 2004 ====
In March 2004, at one night, Krishnasamy noticed his wife was dressing up, and she replied there was a barbeque party with her colleagues at East Coast Park and she told Krishnasamy to no need come and fetch her. Krishnasamy felt peculiar that Chitrabathy would wear a white sleeveless blouse and a long denim skirt for a simple party and remembered she often wear T-shirts and Bermuda shorts. After Chitrabathy left, Krishnasamy felt uneasy throughout and asked one of his friends, who was also a taxi driver, to check if there was a barbeque party at East Coast Park, and it was confirmed by the friend that no such party was conducted at the place.

Feeling angry, Krishnasamy waited for Chitrabathy to come home and even called her several times to tell her come home. After returning home, Chitrabathy was told by Krishnasamy to strip her clothes, as he wanted to check if his wife had sexual intercourse with other people. He found love bites on her breast and some white-like substance on her underwear, which he presumed to be sperm marks. Krishnasamy felt furious about the discovery, and according to him while he recounted the incident in court, Krishnasamy was full of despair that his wife may have cheated on him after he had time and again forgave her for her infidelity.

Subsequently, for the next few days until 8 April 2004, Krishnasamy would interrogate his wife on a few "family meetings" and asked if she had once again cheated on her, and he did so in the presence of his children. Not only that, during that period, Krishnasamy would call his wife and Ashok, whom he suspected was the person Chitrabathy had a relationship with. All the time, he would find that the phone lines of both Ashok and his wife were engaged at the same time, and once his wife stopped using the phone, he found Ashok's line would also become not engaged at the same time. Although the evidence he uncovered were not corroborated and only circumstantial, these only made Krishnasamy becoming more certain that his wife was having an affair with Ashok. This culminated into him taking a knife to stab Chitrabathy twice, after he confronted her and his wife calling him a "madman", which provoked Krishnasamy to stab his wife. Krishnasamy was charged for causing grievous hurt two days after the stabbing incident.

On 7 May 2004, Krishnasamy was released on bail. By then, Krishnasamy was depressed about Chitrabathy's unfaithfulness and how he had forgiven Chitra despite her many affairs throughout their twenty years of marriage. Even though his family and friends advised him to forget about Chitrabathy and his sister also promised to find another woman for Krishnasamy to remarry, Krishnasamy kept mulling over the possibility to mend his relationship with Chitrabathy and after his attempts failed, Krishnasamy finally formulated the plan to kill his wife, feeling that he cannot divorce her and stand seeing her with another man, and even thought that if he himself could not have Chitrabathy as his wife, nobody else would have her as well. For this, he went to a hardware shop at Telok Blangah to buy a parang, but in the end, he bought a chopper for $25, claiming he needed it to slaughter goats at a temple. Krishnasamy also read up a law book belonging to one of his nephews, in which he found out that the offence of murder warranted the death penalty in Singapore, and he remembered it.

On 17 May 2004, ten days after his release on bail, according to Krishnasamy, he went to his wife's workplace, where the staff was informed beforehand that Krishnasamy should not be allowed to enter the premises. Even so, Krishnasamy was able to enter and approach Chitrabathy with the pretense of wanting to sign divorce papers (a reason he used to persuade the security guard to let him in), and he managed to kill her after she turned her back on him. After which, he informed his family, in-laws and friends about the killing, and he surrendered himself after his friends and brother persuaded him to give himself up. According to Krishnasamy, he felt glad that she died at his hands and he felt peaceful, although the only regret was, his children did not have a mother anymore. Before Krishnasamy made his defence, two of Chitrabathy's former boyfriends, Michael Lee and Vel Murugan Perumal (who returned to Malaysia in 1992), came to court as witnesses and confirmed that Chitrabathy indeed dated them even though she was married.

=== Psychiatric evidence ===
After Krishnasamy made his testimony in court, his defense counsel called on two psychiatrists to testify and corroborate his main defense of diminished responsibility.

The first was Dr George John Fernandez, a consultant psychiatrist of the Institute of Mental Health (IMH). Dr Fernandez testified that from his assessment of Krishnasamy, he found that the former taxi driver suffered from morbid jealousy, a delusional disorder that made a person harbour rigid and irrational suspicions about his/her spouse's sexual unfaithfulness based on unfounded proof, and also explore socially unacceptable behavior under the influence of these delusions. Dr Fernandez cited several instances of Krishnasamy's abnormal behavior to support his diagnosis, including Krishnasamy harshly and oppressively interrogating Chitrabathy on many occasions about her alleged affair with Ashok in the presence of his children, Krishnasamy's conclusion that Chitrabathy was speaking to Ashok after finding both their phone lines were engaged, and Krishnasamy forcing Chitrabathy to strip herself to check her underwear for signs of sexual intercourse.

Dr Stephen Phang, a forensic psychiatrist, was the second psychiatric expert engaged by the defense. Like Dr Fernandez before him, Dr Phang diagnosed Krishnasamy to be suffering from morbid jealousy, and he also emphasized that despite him able to calmly and coherently planning his wife's murder and execute the plot, Krishnasamy's actions were a result of him giving in to his delusional beliefs about his wife's infidelity and acting under an abnormal mind, and he stated that an abnormal person suffering from certain psychiatric disorders could still retain the capability to make and carry out elaborate plans. In conclusion of their respective court testimonies, both Dr Phang and Dr Fernandez agreed that Krishnasamy was suffering from diminished responsibility at the material time, as a result of morbid jealousy. One of the psychiatrists even described the murder of Chitrabathy as a "ritualistic killing".

In rebuttal, the prosecution, which disagreed with the defence's contention, called on Dr Ang Ah Ling to testify that Krishnasamy was not suffering from diminished responsibility and there was no impairment of his planning and mental ability, although Dr Ang conceded that Krishnasamy indeed suffered from morbid jealousy.

=== Verdict ===
On 26 April 2006, nearly two years after the murder of Chitrabathy Narayanasamy, the trial judge Woo Bih Li delivered his verdict.

In his verdict, Justice Woo accepted that Krishnasamy was indeed suffering from morbid jealousy. Specifically, Justice Woo made use of the three-limb test to make an analysis of whether Krishnasamy was indeed suffering from diminished responsibility, mainly on whether there was a substantial impairment of his mental faculties at the time he killed Chitrabathy. On the first limb, Justice Woo accepted that Krishnasamy suffered from an abnormality of the mind, and by the second limb, the judge accepted that morbid jealousy was a psychiatric disorder and it induced Krishnasamy's mental abnormality.

However, moving on to the third limb, Justice Woo did not accept that the disorder had substantially impaired Krishnasamy's mental responsibility, since he was capable of planning and carrying out the murder of his wife, and he himself was also aware that the offence of murder warrants a mandatory death sentence in Singapore.

Therefore, Justice Woo rejected the defence's contention that Krishnasamy suffered from diminished responsibility, and therefore found Krishnasamy guilty of murder. Upon his conviction for murder, 44-year-old G Krishnasamy Naidu was sentenced to death in accordance to Section 302 of the Penal Code, under which the death penalty was mandated for murder.

After sentencing, Fernando's lawyers expressed that they would appeal. Krishnasamy's sister openly wept in court at the verdict, although Krishnasamy smiled at the sentence before he calmly left the courtroom. He was held on death row at Changi Prison while pending his appeal against his conviction.

== Krishnasamy's appeal ==
=== Hearing and outcome ===
On 21 September 2006, the Court of Appeal, after they heard Krishnasamy's appeal in August 2006, was scheduled to deliver the verdict.

The three-judge panel, consisting of three High Court judges Tay Yong Kwang, V. K. Rajah and Choo Han Teck, found that on the totality of evidence, Krishnasamy's defence of diminished responsibility should be accepted because his mental responsibility at the time of the murder was substantially impaired by morbid jealousy. Justice Choo, who delivered the ruling in court, cited that the three judges were of the view that the trial judge Woo Bih Li had failed to render a reasonable explanation in his ruling on why he dismissed Krishnasamy's defence despite accepting that Krishnasamy indeed had morbid jealousy. The judge read that although the three-limb test was essential to determine an accused person's psychiatric condition and whether it led to a substantial abnormality of the mind, its application in Krishnasamy's case was a serious incongruity and erred in the sense that Krishnasamy's actions were a result of an abnormal mind and his delusional beliefs that his wife cheated on him, as cited by the medical reports of the defence's two psychiatric experts.

Justice Choo also cited a statement from Dr Phang's report, in which Dr Phang had emphasized that a mentally abnormal person was still capable of exercising, forming and executing elaborate plans. The three judges also stated that Justice Woo's decision amounted to an arbitrary distinction between Krishnasamy's case and the normal instance of a schizophrenic person with an abnormal mind who made plans to go to a hospital and retrieve and pay for their prescribed medication. Based on these findings, the Court of Appeal decided to set aside Krishnasamy's murder conviction and revoke his death sentence, and instead found him guilty of a lower charge of culpable homicide not amounting to murder, equivalent to manslaughter in Singaporean legal terms. Krishnasamy's sentencing trial was scheduled to take place in the next three weeks as the appellate court required time to hear submissions on sentence. Peter Fernando reportedly requested for an eight-week adjournment in order to seek a new psychiatric report on Krishnasamy's condition as reference for the appellate court to calibrate the appropriate sentence for his client, but his request was dismissed.

Reportedly, Krishnasamy's family members and friends were present in court and they were all relieved at the Court of Appeal's decision to overturn his conviction and sentence. Fernando also expressed his relief at the appellate court's reprieve and stated, "Words can't describe my feelings that the rope of death has been removed from around my client’s neck."

In contrast however, Krishnasamy's two children and Chitrabathy's family members (also Krishnasamy's in-laws) were greatly disappointed to hear that Krishnasamy no longer faced the death penalty for murdering Chitrabathy. Krishnasamy's son, then 17 years old, reportedly said that he preferred his father getting hanged for his mother's murder. Krishnasamy reportedly sent his son a birthday card on the boy's birthday on 3 September 2006, 18 days before his appeal was allowed by the Court of Appeal.

=== Re-sentencing ===
On 13 October 2006, Krishnasamy returned for a re-sentencing hearing at the Court of Appeal before the same three judges who allowed his appeal. He faced a sentence of up to ten years' imprisonment or life imprisonment for the reduced charge of manslaughter.

Fernando argued for his client to serve ten years in prison. He cited that Krishnasamy had been undergoing treatment while in prison for the past 28 months and his disorder could still be fully addressed with appropriate medical treatment, and his condition was only peculiar to his marital issues and thus he cannot be considered as a threat to society. Fernando also cited that one of Krishnasamy's cousins also made arrangements for Krishnasamy to live with her upon his release in the future, and having killed the one and only love of his life, Krishnasamy himself would live with what he had to reap from his actions, and therefore, Fernando asked the appellate court to spare Krishnasamy from the possibility of a life term and temper justice with mercy and compassion.

However, Deputy Public Prosecutor (DPP) Lau Wing Yum, who represented the prosecution in the appeal hearing, argued that Krishnasamy still posed a danger to any other individuals who were, "in one way or another", involved in the matter of his wife's infidelity, citing Krishnasamy's supposed threat to murder Chitrabathy's sister after killing his own wife. Describing Krishnasamy as a person with "unstable character" and pointing out his refusal to accept that he was mentally ill, the prosecution also further argued that should Krishnasamy be released and start a new relationship with another female, his illness would likely re-emerge and lead to a relapse, signalling the potential risk he may pose to other people's safety,. DPP Lau also argued that Krishnasamy deserved to be jailed for as long as it was permissible by law so as to keep him monitored in a controlled environment and under high security to ensure he regularly adhere to his medication and check-ups for his psychiatric condition. As such, DPP Lau requested the appellate court to have Krishnasamy locked away for life.

On the same day, after hearing the submissions from both the prosecution and defence, the three-judge panel made their decision. Justice Choo, who delivered the ruling on behalf of the panel, stated that by a unanimous decision, the Court of Appeal decided to sentence 45-year-old G Krishnasamy Naidu to the maximum penalty of life imprisonment, after they accepted the prosecution's arguments and rejected the mitigation plea of Fernando for a ten-year term of imprisonment.

In accordance to the landmark ruling of Abdul Nasir Amer Hamsah's appeal on 20 August 1997, an offender sentenced to life imprisonment must remain behind bars for the rest of his or her natural life. This was in contrast to the previous law where it decreed that a life term was equivalent to a fixed jail term of twenty years. The legal change was applicable to criminal cases that were committed after 20 August 1997. Since the killing of Chitrabathy Narayanasamy occurred on 17 May 2004, six years and nine months after the legal reform, Krishnasamy was to be imprisoned for the remainder of his whole life under his life sentence with pursuant to the amended law.

Reportedly, Krishnasamy's brother was disappointed at the sentence and Krishnasamy's cousin wept before relatives helped bring her out of the courthouse. In contrast, Krishnasamy was dazed for a moment before he smiled at his friends and relatives and wished them a happy Deepavali.

Since the end of his court sessions, Krishnasamy is currently serving his life sentence at Changi Prison. Although Krishnasamy would spend the rest of his life in jail, he is still entitled to be released on parole after serving at least twenty years out of his sentence.

== Aftermath ==
Shortly after Krishnasamy was sentenced to life in prison, Goh Kian Huat, who contributed an essay about the costs of life imprisonment in comparison to capital punishment (which was said to be more expensive), stated that a life sentence may be lower than that of death, but it was actually more appropriate because compared to the harsher sentence of death, an offender serving a life term would be paying a heavy price for his wrongful actions daily while he spent the remainder of his life behind bars. Another source revealed that some members of the public felt Krishnasamy's punishment of lifelong imprisonment was too lenient due to the brutality of the murder.

Singaporean crime show True Files re-enacted the killing of Chitrabathy and aired it as the ninth and penultimate episode of the show's fifth and final season on 11 March 2007.

In 2011, another Singaporean crime show In Cold Blood also re-enacted the case and aired it as the second episode of the show's first season.

N. Sivanandan, the Indian court interpreter of Krishnasamy's trial who retired in the 2010s after five decades on his job, wrote a book about the past high-profile cases where he acted as the interpreter at trial, and the book was published in 2019. Sivanandan stated that the case was shocking to the whole ethnic Indian community in Singapore. He said some people felt Chitrabathy may be in the wrong for being repeatedly unfaithful to Krishnasamy but regardless, the overall reaction amounted to sympathy for the victim, because a lot of people felt Krishnasamy should not have resorted to killing his wife.

A 2021 article from The Smart Local named the murder of Chitrabathy Narayanasamy as one of the nine most terrible crimes that brought shock to Singapore in the 2000s.

== See also ==
- Capital punishment in Singapore
- Life imprisonment in Singapore
