= Murder of Bock Tuan Thong =

2004 robbery-murder of a scrap car dealer in Singapore

Bock Tuan Thong
- Bock Tuan Thong, the robbery-murder victim
- Born: Bock Tuan Thong; 1948; Colony of Singapore
- Died: 2 April 2004 (aged 56); Boon Keng, Singapore
- Cause of death: Murdered
- Occupation: Scrap car dealer
- Employer: Himself
- Known for: Murder victim
- Children: 1 son

On 2 April 2004, a 56-year-old Singaporean and scrap car dealer named Bock Tuan Thong (Chinese: 莫镇鸿; Pe̍h-ōe-jī: Bo̍k Tìn-hông; pinyin: Mò Zhènhóng) was found dead inside the boot of his brother's car at a multi-storey carpark in Boon Keng, Singapore. According to witnesses, Bock was last seen with two to three men, who were inside the car with him and assaulted him.

Subsequently, two of Bock's suspected killers, Tony Koh Zhan Quan (Chinese: 许展权; Pe̍h-ōe-jī: Khó͘ Tián-koân; pinyin: Xǔ Zhănquán) and Lim Poh Lye (Chinese: 林保来; Pe̍h-ōe-jī: Lîm Pó-lâi; pinyin: Lín Băolái), surrendered themselves to the authorities and were charged with murder, although the third offender, Ng Kim Soon (Chinese: 黄金顺; Pe̍h-ōe-jī: N̂g Kim-sūn; pinyin: Huáng Jīnshùn; alias Ah Soon or Philip Ng), remains at large till today. Both Lim and Koh, who both claimed trial at the High Court for murder, stated that their only intention was to rob the victim and not to kill the victim, and it was a robbery that went wrong.

Subsequently, at the end of the trial, Lim and Koh were found guilty of robbery with hurt and sentenced to caning and terms of imprisonment between 15 and 20 years. However, upon the prosecution's appeal, the Court of Appeal found the two men guilty of murder and sentenced them to death. Lim and Koh were hanged on 28 April 2006 at Changi Prison. As of today, the final accomplice, Ng, has not been caught.

== Murder investigation ==
On 2 April 2004, at a carpark in Boon Keng, 56-year-old Bock Tuan Thong, a scrap car dealer, was found dead in the car boot of his brother's car. The man was found with stab wounds on his legs, and his face was badly beaten. The police classified the case as murder, and investigations began. Bock was survived by his wife and his 15-year-old son. Bock's widow Tan Ai Wah said her husband was a friendly man and she did not understand why he was killed. Bock's friends were also shocked to hear about his death. At least four people stated that they witnessed the victim being abducted and assaulted by a group of few men, and a friend of Bock stated that while he was calling Bock, the phone call suddenly came to an abrupt end and he heard some harsh words, signalling to him that something happened to Bock before his death.

Three days later, a coffee shop helper named Lim Poh Lye, aged 44, surrendered himself to the police. He confessed that he was one of the three people who tried to rob Bock after abducting him, but it ended with the death of Bock. His two accomplices, who ran off to Malaysia, were identified as Ng Kim Soon and Tony Koh Zhan Quan.

Lim was charged with murder on 7 April 2004, two days after he surrendered himself. If found guilty of murder, Lim would be sentenced to death. The police placed the names of Ng and Koh on the wanted list, and asked for the help of Malaysian authorities to trace their whereabouts.

Ten weeks after the case, on 18 May 2004, 36-year-old Tony Koh, who ran off to Malaysia with Ng, surrendered himself to the Royal Malaysia Police in Kuala Lumpur. On 22 May 2004, Koh was extradited back to Singapore and became the second suspect to be charged with murder two days later. Koh, who worked as a freelance Taoist priest, was divorced and also listed as a person with undischarged bankruptcy since 1997. However, the third and final suspect, 43-year-old Ng Kim Soon, was never caught despite the authorities' efforts to trace his whereabouts and bring him to justice.

== Trial of Lim and Koh ==
=== Prosecution's case ===
On 28 September 2004, both Lim Poh Lye and Tony Koh Zhan Quan stood trial for the murder of Bock Tuan Thong at the High Court. Choo Han Teck was the judge who presided over the hearing, and Amarjit Singh was the trial prosecutor. Loo Ngan Chor represented Koh and Ismail Hamid represented Lim as their respective defence counsels. As of the time when both Lim and Koh stood trial, Ng Kim Soon, who was pinpointed as the mastermind of the case, remained at large for killing Bock.

Some of the witnesses who saw the assault on Bock came to court to testify for the prosecution. Two of these witnesses, Yuen Siew Kuan and his daughter Audrey Yuen, testified that they happened to be behind Bock's car when it happened. Both father and daughter told the court that when they were driving along Jalan Wangi, they saw Bock trying to run out of the car in front of them, with both Lim and Koh trying to restrain Bock and prevent him from getting out. Koh, whom they identified as the driver, was seen stopping the car at the side and coming out, and he violently slammed the car door against Bock's leg.

Daniel Sin, another prosecution witness, also told the court that when he was somewhere at Upper Serangoon, he was next to Bock's car and saw bloodstains at the headrest. He followed the car and also saw Bock being assaulted by Koh and Lim, while the driver's seat was occupied by Ng. Sin also saw the car being driven to a Boon Keng carpark and it was abandoned by the trio. It was Sin who reported the location of the car to the police.

Dr Clarence Tan, who performed an autopsy on the victim, came to court to present his medical findings. He said that Bock had injuries on his face and body, indicating he had been punched. He also said there were seven stab wounds on both of Bock's legs. Dr Tan pointed out that one of the wounds on the right thigh was deep and it cut through the femoral artery, resulting in an excessive blood loss, and it was sufficient to cause death in the ordinary course of nature. During cross-examination by the defendants' lawyers, Dr Tan agreed that compared to the chest, head and neck, a normal person did not have the knowledge that a person may die should the femoral artery on the thigh was cut through.

The prosecution argued that both men should be held liable for the offence of murder since they intentionally inflicted the injuries on Bock, such that one of the wounds was fatal enough to cause his death, and it was not important to take into account the defendants' lack of medical knowledge about the fatality of severing the femoral artery on the leg. They also stated that the trio had the common intention to kidnap Bock with a view to commit armed robbery, and the stabbing was in furtherance of the common intention to abduct and rob Bock.

=== Defence's case ===
Lim Poh Lye, the first accused.

Tony Koh Zhan Quan, the second accused.

Lim Poh Lye was the first to go to the stand. Lim recounted that after he was roped in to help both Ng and Koh to rob Bock, they went to a carpark in Ubi where they abducted Bock, who was lured to meet the trio for a business discussion. At that time, Bock was driving his brother's car to meet up with the trio since his personal vehicle was sent for repairs. Lim said that before abducting Bock, they prepared two bottles of Coke spiked with sleeping tablets and some detergent, with the spiked drinks meant to put Bock to sleep and the detergent meant to blind Bock to avoid him identifying them. While they were driving to the United Overseas Bank (UOB) at MacPherson, Ng forcibly asked Bock to write and sign three cheques with S$10,000 each. Two of them, Lim and Koh, remained in the car to keep watch of Bock while Ng went to the bank to cash the cheques. However, when the phone call came from the bank requiring confirmation with Bock before they cash the cheques, Bock suddenly became defiant and resisted the robbers' demand to help them cash the cheques, and tried to escape.

According to Lim, he and Koh restrained Bock and assaulted him to stop him from escaping. They drove for a considerable distance before they stopped to pick up Ng, who left the bank by then (but he left his IC behind). Lim recounted that out of uncontrollable rage against Bock for refusing to comply to their earlier attempt to retrieve his money, Ng picked up a big knife and stabbed Bock on the right thigh more than once. According to Lim, the fatal wounds identified by the forensic pathologist was inflicted by Ng. Lim also admitted he took part in the stabbing after Ng finished stabbing Bock, who was also fed sedatives and the spiked drinks. Lim said that he joined in to stop Bock from continuing to struggle and kick, and stop him from continuing to attempt making his escape, and not out of an intention to take his life. On the way, after the stabbing and Bock losing consciousness, the men applied detergent on the unconscious Bock's eyes to make him blind and not able to identify them. After which, the trio abandoned Bock and the car at a carpark in Boon Keng, and placed the body inside the car boot before they went their separate ways. Lim also said that the original plan did not involve causing any hurt to Bock, but his attempt to escape caught them by surprise, and it resulted in the stabbing.

Tony Koh was the second person to come to the stand to testify. Most of his accounts were essentially the same as Lim's version of events. However, the main difference out of the several minor differences was that, Koh said that based on what he remembered seeing, Lim was the only one out of the three robbers who stabbed Bock on the legs, and claimed that Ng never participated in the stabbing. He stated that he never took part in the stabbing, and had only assaulted Bock to avoid him from trying to escape the car, and denied concocting evidence to distance himself from the stabbing. Overall, both men gave a defense that they never intend or plan to commit murder or at least cause injury to Bock, and insisted that it was a robbery that gone horribly wrong, and since Bock took them by surprise, they panicked and acted way off their plan and hurt him while trying to stop him from escaping.

=== Verdict ===
On 24 January 2005, the trial judge Choo Han Teck delivered his verdict.

In his judgement, Justice Choo stated that he was satisfied that the two defendants, Lim and Koh, never had the intention to commit the murder of Bock. He said that it was not clear who was the person that inflicted the fatal wound based on the medical evidence, and accepted that the knives were used to just threaten Bock, which was what they had planned all along. Justice Choo also stated that there was no intention on the part of the trio to inflict any wounds that were sufficient to cause death, and Lim's purpose of stabbing the victim (either alone or with Ng's help) was merely to stop Bock from continuing to struggle or resist rather than taking his life, and with the possible accompanying factor of Bock's struggle during the stabbing and its impact on the severity of the wounds caused, Lim (and possibly Ng) never aimed specifically at the region of Bock's thigh to cut through his artery and cause him to die from an excessive loss of blood. Therefore, he found Lim not guilty of murder, and in turn, since Koh himself had the knowledge of the knives and had the common intention with both Lim and Ng to commit armed robbery, and that the charge against both Lim and Koh was framed as murder by common intention, Koh was also deemed not guilty of murder as well.

In the end, Justice Choo reduced the murder charges to robbery with hurt and convicted both Lim Poh Lye and Tony Koh of the lower charges. Consequently, Koh was sentenced to 15 years' imprisonment and 20 strokes of the cane, while Lim was sentenced to the maximum jail term of 20 years and 24 strokes of the cane, the maximum number of cane strokes permissible by law.

== Prosecution's appeal ==
In February 2005, the prosecution filed an appeal against the trial verdict, seeking to overturn the two men's convictions of robbery with hurt and asked that the murder charges be restored after arguing that the trial judge had erred in law to acquit Koh and Lim of murder and cited that it was irrelevant to determine the purpose of stabbing Bock, as the more crucial question was whether there was an intention to inflict the knife wounds and whether the injury inflicted was sufficient to cause death, and also cited the common intention of the trio to commit armed robbery.

On 15 July 2005, the Court of Appeal delivered its verdict after hearing the appeal in March 2005. The three judges - Chao Hick Tin, Lai Kew Chai and Tay Yong Kwang - stated that in view of the evidence, there was no doubt that the two defendants Tony Koh and Lim Poh Lye had committed murder. Although they genuinely never had the intent to kill and only wanted to rob, the stabbing of the victim Bock Tuan Thong was made in furtherance of the common intention to commit armed robbery. The three judges noted that per the arguments of Senior State Counsel Lawrence Ang, who assisted the prosecution, the definition of murder did not necessarily meant an act where the offender intends to cause the death of his victim, but it is also considered an offence of murder if an offender intentionally inflict injuries on his victim and such that the harm caused was sufficient to cause death, pursuant to Section 300(c) of the Penal Code.

Turning to the case of Lim, the three judges found that even though it was not clear whether the third man Ng Kim Soon participated in the stabbing and whether it was Lim or Ng who inflicted the fatal wound, there was no dispute that Lim had participated in the stabbing and irrespective to whoever was responsible for the injury that caused Bock to die, these injuries caused by Lim and possibly Ng were intentional and such that one of the wounds cut through the femoral artery and resulted in the death of Bock due to excessive blood loss. Based on these findings, the Court of Appeal held that Lim was therefore guilty of murder.

Turning to the case of Koh, the three-judge panel stated that prior to the abduction of Bock, Koh had prepared the knives in accordance with their plan to rob Bock. They deemed that Koh had the knowledge that the knives would be used during the robbery, and he also shared the common intention with both Ng and Lim to commit armed robbery. The victim was also stabbed in order to carry out the trio's common intention. Therefore, the Court of Appeal held that Koh was also guilty of murder.

As a result, the Court of Appeal allowed the prosecution's appeal, and found both 45-year-old Lim Poh Lye and 38-year-old Tony Koh Zhan Quan guilty of the original charges of murder, and sentenced both men to death, effectively overruling the trial decision and overturning both men's jail terms and robbery convictions. It was reported that Bock's wife accepted the verdict, and she expressed that she would visit her husband's resting place to inform him of the appeal ruling.

== Executions of Lim and Koh ==
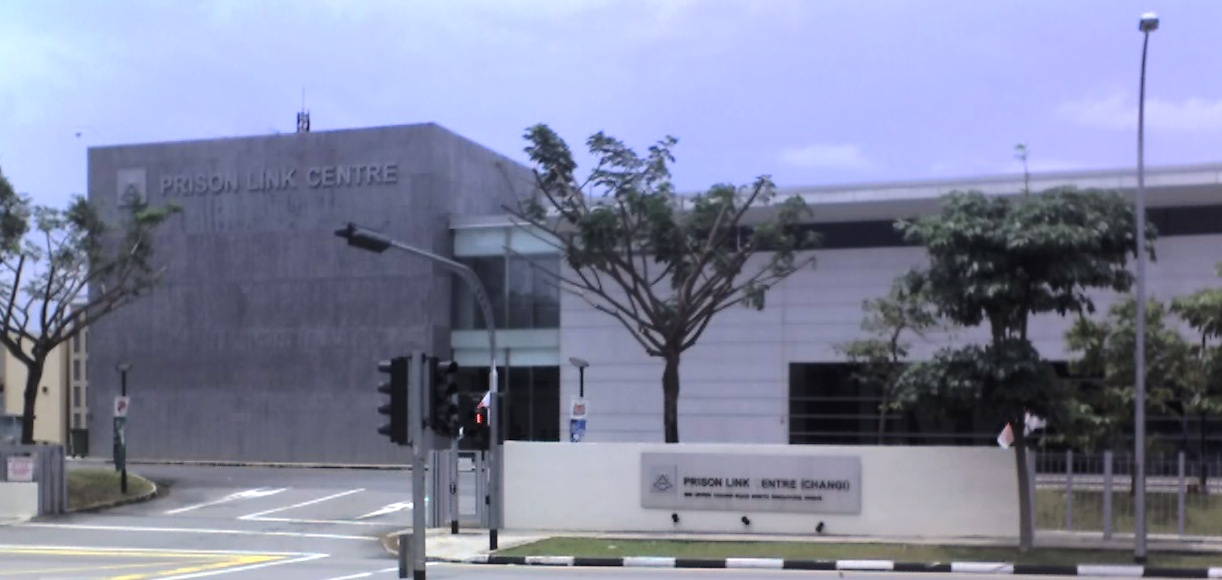
Changi Prison Complex, where Koh and Lim were hanged after their nine-month stay on death row.

While they were held on death row at Changi Prison, both Tony Koh Zhan Quan and Lim Poh Lye made another appeal to overturn their death sentences. Their lawyers argued that the prosecution had only the right to appeal in cases where they opposed an defendant's sentence or acquittal, and that both men were not acquitted of murder, since the original murder charges were merely reduced to lesser offences of robbery with hurt and the men were convicted of lower charges, and there was no pronouncement of an acquittal by the trial court. However, the Court of Appeal agreed with the prosecution that the trial judge had found both Lim and Koh not guilty of murder, which was equivalent to an acquittal. Therefore, they dismissed the appeal.

After losing their final legal motion to escape the gallows, both Lim and Koh petitioned for presidential clemency to commute their sentences of death to life in prison. However, then President of Singapore S. R. Nathan refused to pardon both men and rejected their petitions on 10 April 2006. Reportedly, Lim's nine-year-old son, who had been visiting his father in jail, was unaware of his father's upcoming execution, which was scheduled to be carried out 18 days later on 28 April 2006. This was concealed by Lim's brothers and other relatives for fear of making the boy sad (since Lim and his son shared a very close father-son relationship), and they planned to tell the child that his father fell sick in prison and died once they made preparations to conduct Lim's funeral after his hanging.

On 28 April 2006, 46-year-old Lim Poh Lye and 39-year-old Tony Koh Zhan Quan were both hanged at dawn in Changi Prison. Also, even after Koh was executed, his bankruptcy remains undischarged and the banks still had the right to claim his family's assets, and he still owed about S$8,000 to his creditors as of May 2007 (a year after Koh died).

== Aftermath ==
In January 2006, K S Rajah, a former judicial commissioner in Singapore, wrote about the case in a legal essay, citing the concern that both Koh and Lim were placed in double jeopardy since they were tried for the same offence by both the trial court and appellate court.

Singaporean crime show Crimewatch re-enacted the case in October 2005, and it aired on television as the eighth episode of the show's annual season.

Two months after Lim and Koh were hanged, another crime show, True Files, also re-enacted the case and aired it as the 12th episode of the show's fourth season on 18 June 2006. To protect the identity of both Lim and Koh, their real-life police mugshots were not revealed on-screen. The former lawyers of Koh and Lim, Ismail Hamid (who represented Lim) and both Loo Ngan Chor and Julian Tay (who both represented Koh) were approached for an interview in the episode, and they stated that both men were remorseful for having caused the death of Bock and stated their plan was merely to rob rather than taking his life.

The cases of Lim and Koh were regarded as one of the rare examples where the Court of Appeal increased an offender's jail term to a death sentence in Singapore, and these cases also include Chia Kee Chen and Kho Jabing, whose life sentences were overturned and replaced with capital punishment for murder. Both of them were since executed; Kho was confirmed to be hanged on 20 May 2016, after he lost his final appeal to commute his sentence.

As of today, Ng Kim Soon, the final accomplice of the murder, remains on the run for masterminding the robbery and murder of Bock Tuan Thong.

== See also ==
- Capital punishment in Singapore
