= Streats =

Former newspaper in Singapore

- Type: Free daily newspaper
- Format: Broadsheet
- Owner: Singapore Press Holdings
- Publisher: Singapore Press Holdings
- Editor: Paul Jansen (2002-2004)
- Founded: 4 September 2000; 25 years ago
- Ceased publication: 31 December 2004; 21 years ago
- Language: English
- Headquarters: Level 7, SPH Media Centre; 82 Genting Lane; Singapore 349567

Streats was an English-language broadsheet daily newspaper in Singapore. It launched in 2000, and ceased publishing in 2004 after being merged into Today.

== History ==
Streats was launched on 4 September 2000 by Singapore Press Holdings (SPH). On 8 March 2004, Streats launched an afternoon edition. It provided financial and sports news, and was given out in selected locations of the business district.

In September 2004, SPH announced that it would sell its two SPH MediaWorks television channels to MediaCorp, publisher of Streats' main competitor Today. As part of the agreement, SPH also acquired 40% and 20% shares in MediaCorp's publishing and MediaCorp TV Holdings divisions, and Streats ceased publication.
