= Today (website) =

Singaporean digital news magazine

- Type: National free newspaper (10 November 2000 to September 2017); National online newspaper (September 2017 to 2024)
- Format: Digital newspaper
- Owner: Mediacorp
- Editor: Loh Chee Kong
- Founded: 10 November 2000; 26 years ago
- Ceased publication: 30 September 2024; 2 years ago
- Language: English
- Headquarters: Mediacorp Campus, 1 Stars Avenue, Singapore 138507
- Circulation: 300,000 (in 2013)
- OCLC number: 46474542
- Website: www.todayonline.com

Today was a Singaporean digital news magazine published by Mediacorp. It was originally established on 10 November 2000 as a free print newspaper, competing primarily with Singapore Press Holdings' (SPH) Streats.

In 2004, SPH announced an agreement to take stakes in Mediacorp's publishing and television businesses, resulting in the discontinuation of Streats and the sale of its two SPH MediaWorks channels to the company. In 2017, Today ended print publication, continuing as a digital publication. In October 2024, Today was merged into CNA, becoming a weekly digital news magazine devoted to long-form journalism.

== History ==
Today launched on 10 November 2000; it was established as a rival to Streats, another English-language freesheet published by Singapore Press Holdings (SPH). Initially, the newspaper was available only on weekdays. It was a partnership between MediaCorp, Singtel, and SMRT. DelGro was also announced as a partner in the paper, but dropped out of the venture shortly before launch.

In 2002, Today launched a weekend version, WeekendTODAY, which was also distributed to homes as a free newspaper but also available for sale at newsstands for 50 cents.

On June 5, 2004 it added Sunday TV listings.

In September 2004, SPH reached an agreement to sell its SPH MediaWorks television channels to MediaCorp. As part of the agreement, Streats ceased publication, and SPH took a 40% stake in MediaCorp's publishing business, and a 20% stake in its MediaCorp TV Holdings business.

On 6 July 2006, Today suspended a weekly opinion column by mrbrown (real name Lee Kin Mun), a satirical blogger, after the government criticised an article he wrote in his column discussing the rising cost of living in Singapore.

In 2010, Today launched the Today—New York Times International Weekly, covering international affairs, social trends, arts and culture as well as business and finance.

In May 2011, the paper launched a Sunday edition, Today on Sunday. In June 2012, the Sunday edition ceased publication.

In 2013, the newspaper had a digital revamp of its website, mobile and tablet applications. It also ceased its afternoon edition. That year, Today had a circulation of 300,000, with more than half of its readers being professionals, managers, executives and businesspeople. It was the second-most-read English-language newspaper in Singapore, after The Straits Times.

In April 2017, Today discontinued its weekend edition, publishing only on weekdays. In September, it then ceased print publication of its weekday edition, continuing as a digital publication only. SPH concurrently divested its stakes in Mediacorp.

On 28 August 2024, Mediacorp announced that Today would be merged into its CNA division effective 1 October 2024, with all staff retained. Today would be relaunched as a "digital long-form weekend magazine" published by CNA, focused on its "The Big Read" features, human interest stories, and opinion columns.

== Editors ==
Name	Appointment
Loh Chee Kong	Chief Editor
Yasmine Yahya	Deputy Chief Editor
Jason Tan	Executive Editor
Jiamei Lin	Supervising Editor
Maria Almenoar	Supervising Editor
Karen Lim	Supervising Editor

== See also ==
- Media in Singapore
- List of free daily newspapers
- List of newspapers in Singapore
- Censorship in Singapore
- The Straits Times
