= 2003 in Singapore =

- Decades: 1980s; 1990s; 2000s; 2010s; 2020s
- See also: Other events of 2003; Timeline of Singaporean history

The following lists events that happened during 2003 in Singapore.

== Incumbents ==
- President: S.R. Nathan
- Prime Minister: Goh Chok Tong

== Events ==
=== January ===
- 1 January –
  - The Goods and Services Tax is raised from 3% to 4%.
  - The Media Development Authority is formed to better regulate and encourage Singapore's media industry.
- 3 January – RSS Courageous got into a collision with ANL Indonesia, causing four fatalities. An investigation found that errors by the RSS Courageous crew contributed to the tragedy.
- 5 January - Ang Mo Kio Library is officially reopened after a one year renovation.
- 17 January – The Majestic is opened as a shopping mall after being renovated from a theatre.
- 18 January – The East Loop of the Sengkang LRT line is opened, as well as the Sengkang Bus Interchange which is Singapore's second air-conditioned bus interchange.
- 20 January – Stage 3 of the Circle MRT line is announced, which will travel through Serangoon and Bishan. It is slated for completion by 2008, but is eventually delayed to 2009.
- 21 January – FairPrice's new Fresh Food Distribution Centre is officially opened, enhancing freshness and safety of food.
- 27 January – The Land Transport Authority introduced a new licensing scheme for taxi operators, resulting in increased competition. Since then, more taxi operators joined in.

=== February ===
- 15 February – The Ministry of Community Development and Sports announced plans to redevelop the National Stadium as part of a recommendation from a study. The proposed S$650m facility will have a 55,000-capacity stadium, a commercial district and indoor halls, which is targeted for completion by 2009 (though work only started in 2010). In addition, new rules are released to increase transparency in National Sports Associations, taking effect from 1 January 2004.
- 17 February – The World Trade Centre Retail reopens as HarbourFront Centre.
- 20 February – Fusionopolis is launched as a place to fuse the infocomm, media and engineering sectors together.
- 21 February – NEWater is launched in Singapore.

=== March ===
- 1 March to 16 July – An outbreak of severe acute respiratory syndrome (SARS) occurs in Singapore.
  - 1 March – The first SARS patient is warded in Tan Tock Seng Hospital, after 3 women fell ill from a visit to Hong Kong.
  - 15 March – The term SARS is coined by the WHO. As a result, the Ministry of Health forms a task force to tackle SARS. On that day, 16 cases are confirmed.
  - 16 March – Guidelines are issued to screen emergency department patients for fever and travel history to SARS-affected areas, as well as on infection-control.
  - 22 March – TTSH is designated the SARS hospital. The SARS hotline is set up, with the number of cases increasing to 44.
  - 24 March – Singapore invokes the Infectious Diseases Act. As a result, about 740 people are placed on Home Quarantine Orders for 10 days.
  - 25 March – The first SARS death happens.
  - 26 March –
    - A second person dies due to SARS.
    - The Ministry of Education (MOE) and Ministry of Health (MOH) will close all primary schools, secondary schools, junior colleges and centralised institutes due to the SARS outbreak from 27 March to 6 April. Due to this, the school term will be extended into the holidays. Institutes of Higher Learning (IHLs) are unaffected by this closure of schools. In addition, childcare centres, special education schools, madrasahs, playgroups and tuition classes will also close during this period with pre-school centres and student care centres advised to close. As a result, this makes it the first time since Singapore's independence that schools are closed.
  - 27 March – Patients who die of SARS must be cremated within 24 hours.
  - 29 March – Temperature checks are introduced for all passengers arriving into Singapore through Changi Airport.
  - 5 April –
    - A SARS outbreak occurs at Singapore General Hospital.
    - MOE and MOH extend school closures with reopening of schools in stages, starting from junior colleges and centralised institutes on 9 April, secondary schools on 14 April and finally primary schools on 16 April. Pre-school centres and kindergartens will be allowed to reopen from 16 April.
  - 6 April – A ministerial committee to tackle SARS is formed.
  - 7 April – TTSH doctor Ong Hok Su becomes the first hospital worker to die from SARS. In addition, another patient dies from SARS.
  - 11 April – The new Infrared Fever Sensing System (IFSS) is introduced in Changi Airport to screen travellers arriving into Singapore. Originally intended for military use, the system is jointly developed by Defence Science & Technology Agency (DSTA) and ST Electronics. 4 more IFSS systems will be deployed by 18 April.
  - 20 April – After several SARS cases discovered, the Pasir Panjang Vegetable Wholesale Market (PPWC) is ordered to close until 29 April.
  - 22 April – SGH surgeon Alexandre Chao dies from SARS.
  - 23 April – All eight IFSS systems are in operation across various checkpoints, including Woodlands Checkpoint and Tuas Checkpoint.
  - 28 April – PPWC's closure is extended until 5 May after the extension of Home Quarantine Orders for tenants and workers there.
  - 29 April – Temperature checks are introduced for all passengers arriving and departing Singapore by sea from 7pm. Tighter screening procedures are also introduced for all cargo and passenger vessels to contain SARS.
  - 11 May – Nurse Hamidah Ismail dies on Mother's Day.
  - 18 May – Last SARS patient detected.
  - 21 May – The SARS Channel is launched in partnership with MediaCorp, SPH MediaWorks and StarHub. The channel shows SARS-related programming, as well as news and infomercials on SARS, broadcasting until 9 July, after all countries are taken off the SARS list.
  - 30 May – Singapore is officially declared SARS-free by the World Health Organization, taking effect the following day.
  - 16 July – SARS is eradicated from Singapore. By the time the outbreak ended, a total of 238 people are infected with 33 dead.
- 1 March – Online identification-based service, SingPass is launched.
- 20 March – The Airport Logistics Park is officially opened.
- 21 March – Compressed natural gas (CNG) taxis are launched to encourage vehicles to run on cleaner fuels.
- 24 March – Downer EDI Group (an Australian firm) announced the acquisition of CPG Corporation from Temasek Holdings, which is completed on 1 April.
- 29 March – ComfortDelGro is formed from the merger of land transport companies Comfort Group and DelGro Corporation, first announced on 21 November 2002. Since then, ComfortDelGro Corporation has become a multinational transport operator.
- 31 March – Daimaru shuts its last stores in Singapore.

=== April ===
- 1 April –
  - The Immigration and Checkpoints Authority is formed to tackle new security threats, leading to the formation of Singapore Customs. As a result, the Registry of Societies and Registry of Political Donations will transfer to the Ministry of Home Affairs and Elections Department respectively.
  - Meidi-Ya opens in Liang Court, taking over what used to be a Daimaru store.
- 28 April – The last traces of the Overseas Union Bank (OUB) name will disappear by end-2003 as it merged into United Overseas Bank (UOB).

=== May ===
- 6 May – Singapore and United States sign the United States-Singapore Free Trade Agreement (USS-FTA).
- 26 May – The Action Community for Entrepreneurship (ACE) is launched to help businesses thrive.

=== June ===
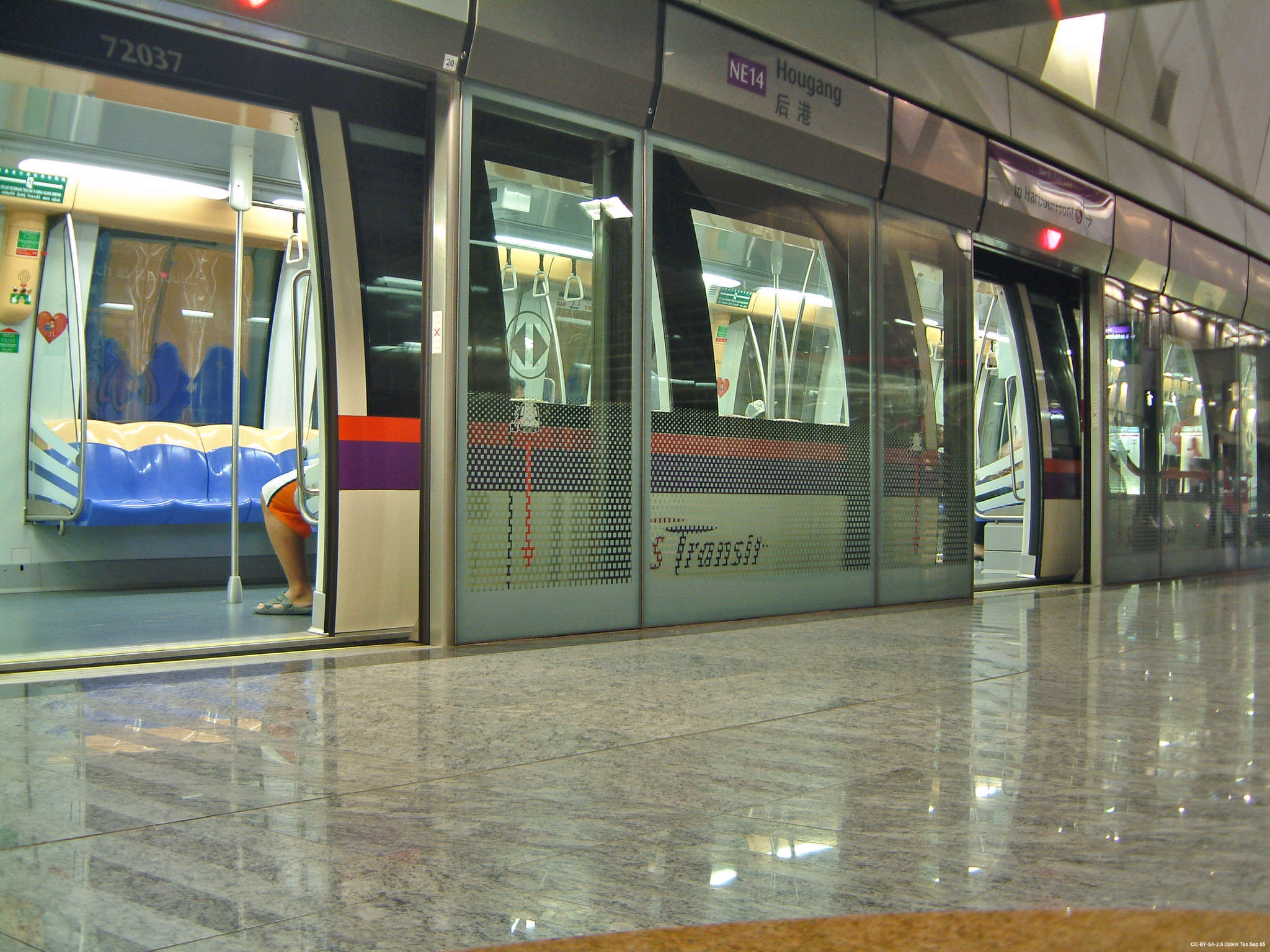
The North East MRT line

- 9 June – The Declaration of Religious Harmony is unveiled.
- 20 June – The North East MRT line opens, the first line operated by SBS Transit. Stretching about 20 km (12 miles) long, the line is the world's first fully automated underground line.

=== July ===
- 1 July – The then HDB Corporation (renamed to Surbana and now Surbana Jurong) is formed from a corporatisation.
- 7 July – The Singapore civil service now allows gay employees to be employed, as revealed in a Time magazine interview.
- 8 July – The Iranian twins are separated, but the operation takes a drastic turn. Both of them eventually passed on.
- 14 July – Bungee jumping will be allowed after being turned down years back on grounds of safety. It is hoped this will encourage a more risk-taking society.
- 22 July – A pair of South Korean twins are successfully separated.
- 24 July – Singapore and Malaysia jointly submit to the International Court of Justice (ICJ) a dispute concerning sovereignty over Pedra Branca (Pulau Batu Puteh, Middle Rocks and South Ledge).

=== August ===
- 1 August –
  - DesignSingapore Council is launched to spearhead design in Singapore.
  - Bar-top dancing is legalised, and some bars are allowed to operate 24/7.
- 4 August – The Sumatra-Singapore gas pipeline is inaugurated.
- 6 August – Creative Technology announced that they will progressively launch 90 new products.
- 25 August – The National Volunteer Centre is renamed to the National Volunteer and Philanthropy Centre.

=== September ===
- 8 September – The Ministry of Health announced that a laboratory technician caught SARS, after a big outbreak earlier in March. It is later learnt that it is caused by a mix-up in viruses for research.
- 17 September – The Singapore Workforce Development Agency is formed to help workers find jobs, especially during the ongoing economic downturn.
- 25 September – BreadTalk launches the first Din Tai Fung restaurant in The Paragon.

=== October ===
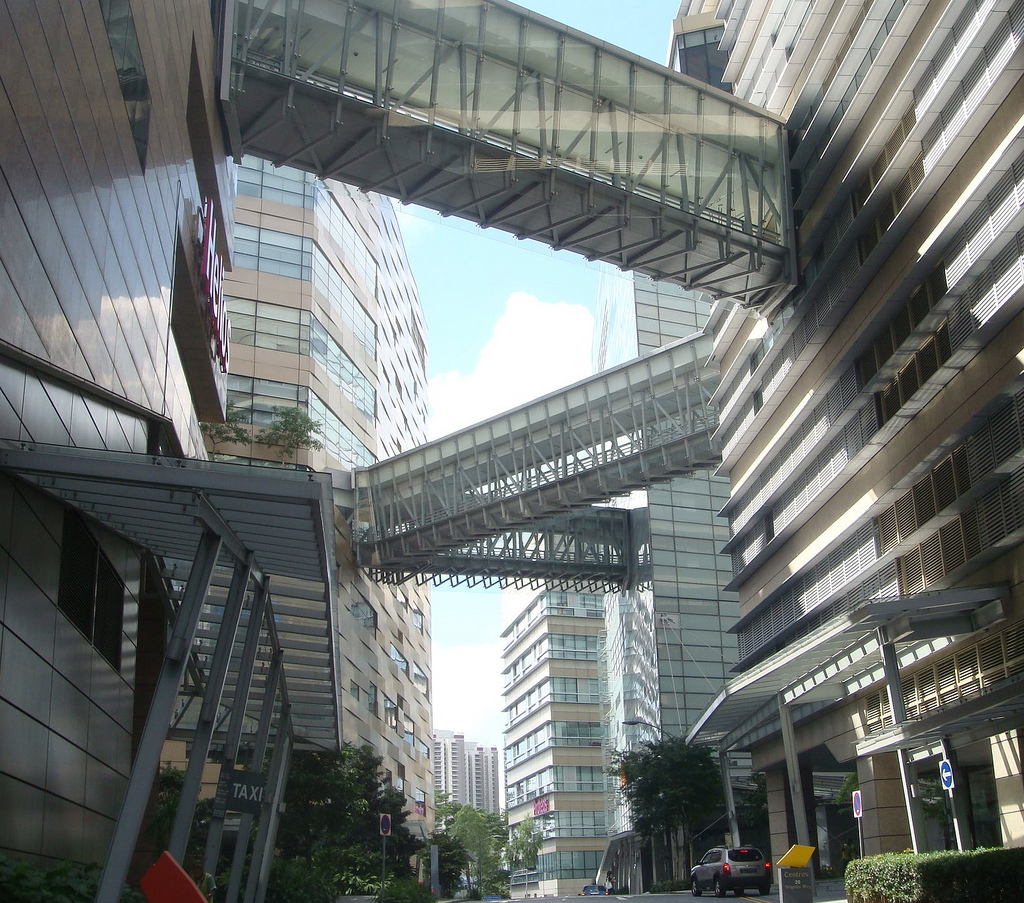
Biopolis

- 1 October – In view of economic restructuring, CPF rates were cut by 3 percentage points.
- 10 October – The Raffles Terrace is officially opened.
- 16 October – MoneySENSE is launched to educate Singaporeans on financial literacy.
- 20 October – The Ministry of Health launched SingaporeMedicine to promote Singapore as a leading medical hub.
- 29 October – Biopolis is opened as a research hub.
- 31 October – The Queenstown Community Library is reopened after upgrading works.

=== November ===
- 10 November – Amendments to the Computer Misuse Act are passed to protect against potential cyberattacks that could disrupt critical information infrastructure (CIIs) on the basis of national security, but not before addressing concerns on privacy and liberties. The new law also compounds certain offences.
- 14 November – Dairy Farm will acquire Delhaize's stake in Shop N Save, which is also owned by QAF Limited.

=== December ===
- 12 December – Stages 4 and 5 of the Circle MRT line are unveiled, connecting western Singapore from Bishan to HarbourFront. It is slated for completion in 2010, but later delayed to 2011.
- 13 December – 10-year-old Megan Zheng becomes the first Singaporean actress to win the Taipei Film Festival Golden Horse Award for Best New Performer (co-recipient) with her role in Jack Neo's movie Homerun.
- 30 December – The Kaki Bukit Viaduct opens to traffic.
- 31 December – Passion 99.5FM shuts down after a lack of funding.

=== Date unknown ===
- A&W pulls out of Singapore, only returning in 2019 at Jewel Changi Airport.

== Deaths ==
- 9 January – Thabun Pranee, murder victim in the Chai Chee rape and murder (b. 1977).
- 23 January – John Ede, former Progressive Party legislative assemblyman for Tanglin Constituency (b. 1913).
- 28 January – Lam Chit Lee, founding Chairman of the Singapore Ex- political Detainees' Association and former Barisan Sosialis candidate for Telok Ayer Constituency in the 1963 General Election (b. 1931).
- 10 March – Diana Teo Siew Peng, murder victim of Harith Gary Lee (b. 1970).
- 24 March – Cheong Wing, former Chairman of the Kreta Ayer Citizens' Consultative Committee (b. 1922).
- 7 April – Ong Hok Su, TTSH doctor (b. 1976).
- 17 April – Ong Poh Lim, former badminton player (b. 1923).
- 22 April – Alexandre Chao, SGH vascular surgeon (b. 1965).
- 11 May – Hamidah Ismail, nurse (b. 1958).
- 12 June – Wee Mon Cheng, former Ambassador of Singapore to Japan (b. 1913).
- 13 June – Tan Teck Khim, former Commissioner of Police (b. 1925).
- 28 June – Chi Tue Tiong, murder victim of Zailani bin Ahmad and Rachel (b. 1935).
- 26 November – Sidney Woodhull, former Barisan Sosialis politician and lawyer (b. 1932).

=== Unknown date ===
- Jonnel Pabuyon Pinera, nurse at Orange Valley Nursing Home.
- Kiew Miyaw Tan, SGH attendant.
