= 2002 in Singapore =

- Decades: 1980s; 1990s; 2000s; 2010s; 2020s
- See also: Other events of 2002; Timeline of Singaporean history

The following lists events that happened during 2002 in Singapore.

== Incumbents ==
- President: S.R. Nathan
- Prime Minister: Goh Chok Tong

== Events ==
=== January ===
- 1 January – The re-registration of NRICs starts for those aged 30 and above. Those turning 30 on or after 1 January 2002 are required to re-register for a new NRIC if they had not replaced their NRIC within the past 10 years.
- 2 January – City Gas is formed from PowerGas.
- 5 January – The National Science and Technology Board is renamed to the Agency for Science, Technology and Research (A*Star).
- 9 January –
  - A Passenger Security Service Charge will be introduced for passengers who use Changi Airport from 1 March. This is so as to cover security costs incurred in the wake of the 9/11 attacks. In addition, Changi Airport will upgrade Terminal 2 for S$200 million.
- 11 January – The new building housing the Family and Juvenile Court is officially opened, having been brought together in September 2001.
- 12 January – MediaCorp channel CityTV ceases transmission after two years due to lack of viewership and poor economic climate.
- 13 January – Singapore and Japan signed the Japan–Singapore Economic Agreement for a New Age Partnership, making it Singapore's first free-trade agreement FTA with a major trading partner.
- 14 January – Reclamation works around Chek Jawa area will be deferred as long as development works are not required, with plans made to conserve the island instead.
- 25 January –
  - Osim's new headquarters is officially opened.
  - Three statutory boards under Ministry of Trade and Industry are renamed to International Enterprise Singapore, SPRING Singapore and Agency for Science, Technology and Research respectively to deal with a changing economy.

=== February ===
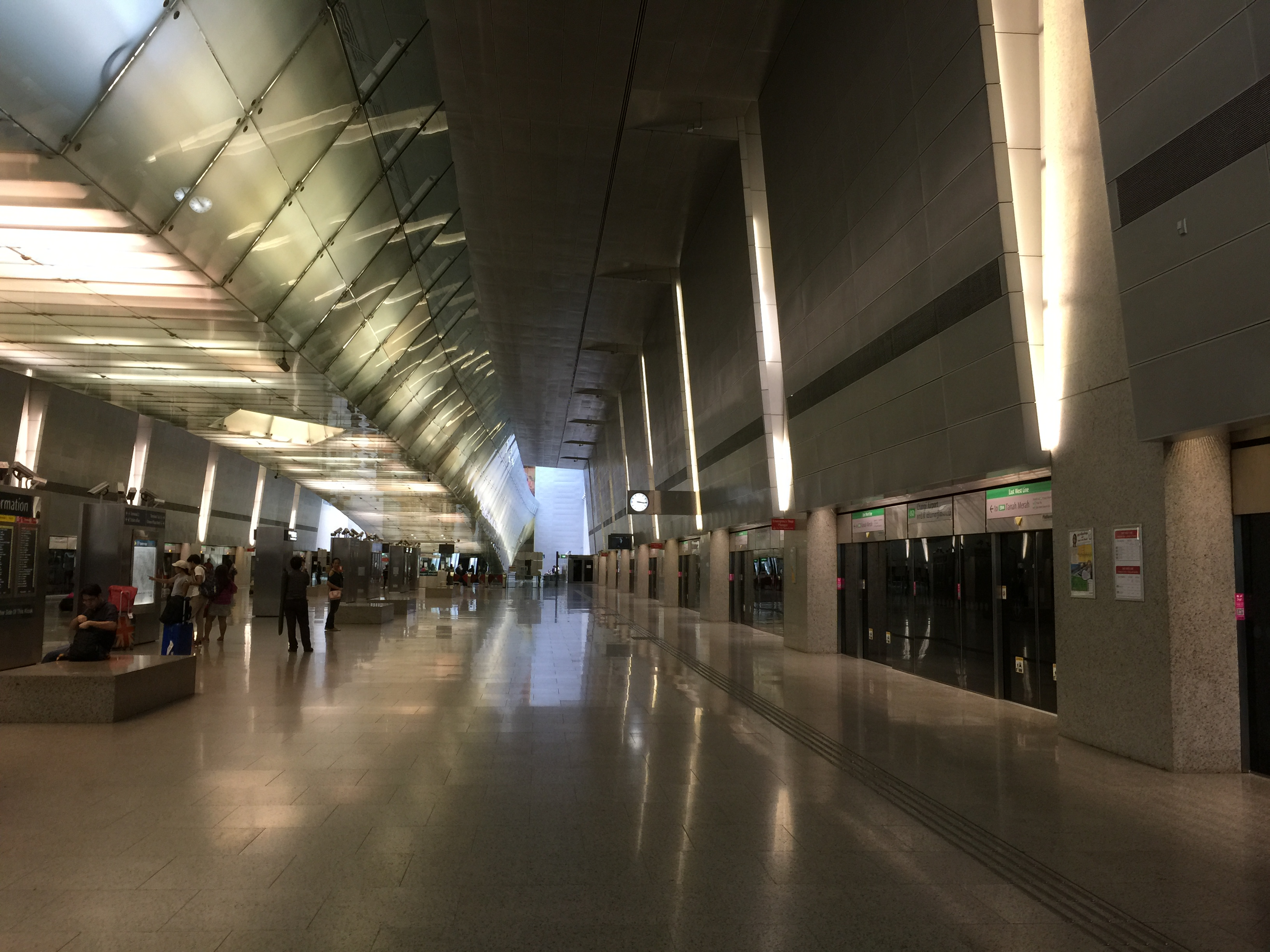
Changi Airport MRT station

- 8 February –
  - Changi Airport MRT station is opened for revenue service.
  - The SAF's new clubhouse, The Chevrons is officially opened.
  - Singapore's first elected President Ong Teng Cheong dies from lymphoma cancer at 8:14pm.
- 9 February –
  - Jack Neo's I Not Stupid is released. The film triggered a discussion on education streaming, which led to the merging of EM1 and EM2 streams in 2004, with abolishment of EM3 streams by 2008.
  - The Opera Estate Drainage Scheme is completed, having a storage tank during rains.
- 11 February – The Singapore flags flew at half mast as a mark of respect to mourn the passing of the nation's first elected President Ong Teng Cheong, who died from lymphoma cancer three days earlier at 8:14pm. It was considered very inauspicious by Chinese people since it coincided with Chinese New Year's Eve.
- 12 February –
  - 371 staff members of Singapore Press Holdings moved from their old office at Times House to SPH News Centre at Toa Payoh.
  - A state-assisted funeral was held for Ong Teng Cheong.
- 16 February – The Upper Serangoon Viaduct is opened.
- 25 February – Keppel TatLee Bank merges into OCBC Bank.
- 27 February – During the official opening of the Changi Airport line, 15 out of 16 stations along the North East MRT line (including Potong Pasir and Punggol) will open after a review, leaving Woodleigh closed.
- 28 February –
  - Construction starts on National Trades Union Congress's new building, with completion by 2004.
  - Golden Village closes its Eastpoint cinema due to poor performance and was subsequently replaced by a bunch of tuition and enrichment centres.

=== March ===
- 1 March –
  - The prefix '6' is added to all landline phones.
  - The Changi Business Aviation Centre is opened for business travellers who fly via executive jets. Plans are announced to strengthen the aviation industry, including a future dedicated Business Aviation Centre in Changi Airport subject to demand and research and development projects via AIRport Systems Technology, Research, and Innovation Platform (AIRSTRIP).
- 3 March – TV Works is renamed to Channel i.
- 5 March – Construction of the five-stage Circle MRT line starts, spanning 34 km (21 miles) orbitally. The first two stages are scheduled for completion by 2006 with the rest by 2010.
- 8 March – Singapore Press Holdings's new headquarters (named 'News Centre' on 11 November) is officially opened.
- 16 March – Raffles Hospital is officially opened.
- 20 March – PSA Corporation acquires logistics company CWT.
- 27 March – Singapore Management University's new campus starts construction. Targets for primary cohort in universities will be raised from 21 percent now to 25 percent in 2010.

=== April ===
- 1 April –
  - The Board of Commissioners of Currency, Singapore stops issuing 1-cent coins.
  - The Singapore Business Federation is launched to represent businesses in Singapore.
- 10 April – The Singapore Tyler Print Institute (now STPI - Creative Workshop & Gallery) is officially opened in Clarke Quay.
- 13 April – A contact-based card system used for travel, EZ-Link, is launched for sale.
- 15 April – The Health Sciences Authority orders a stop on Slim 10 sales in a suit caused by one death and a high-profile liver failure case.
- 25 April – The Merlion is relocated to Merlion Park, 30 years since it first launched.

=== May ===
- 5 May – Khoo Swee Chiow reaches the North Pole, becoming the first Singaporean to do so. As a result, he conquered both the North Pole and the South Pole.
- 15 May – StarHub and Singapore Cable Vision agree to merge with the new entity starting operations on 1 October.
- 19 May – The Toa Payoh Bus Interchange opens, the first air-conditioned interchange.

=== June ===
- June – Zhenghua Nature Park is completed.
- 1 June – SIA's SpaceBed is launched to enhance travellers' comfort.
- 8 June – The Housing and Development Board closes their Bukit Merah headquarters.
- 10 June – The Housing and Development Board moves into HDB Hub in Toa Payoh, being their new headquarters.
- 16 June – The merger of Overseas Union Bank into United Overseas Bank is completed.

=== July ===
- 1 July – The National Environment Agency is launched to tackle environmental issues.
- 10–21 July – The 2002 ACC Trophy is held.

=== August ===
- 1 August –
  - Republic Polytechnic is established, which teaches with Problem-Based Learning.
  - Compass Point in Sengkang opens its doors to the public.
- 8 August – Soon Lee Bus Depot is officially opened as a new multi-storey depot, replacing the former Jurong Bus Depot. A second depot in Bedok is expected by 2004.
- 24 August – The Singapore Green Plan 2012 is launched.

=== September ===
- 5 September – A new Automated People Mover system (now the Changi Airport Skytrain) is announced. The system will link all three terminals, which was completed in 2006.
- 12 September – library@esplanade is opened in Esplanade as a performing arts library.
- 15 September – The Merlion is reopened in the new Merlion Park.
- 23 September – The Heritage Trees Scheme is officially launched to conserve trees of historical value, with some of them ranging 80 to 100 years old. An initial list of 36 trees has been drawn up.
- 30 September –
  - NRICs will not display blood types from today due to quick blood tests that can be obtained easily.
  - ElderShield is launched as an insurance plan for those with severe disabilities. It will pay S$300 over 5 years.

=== October ===
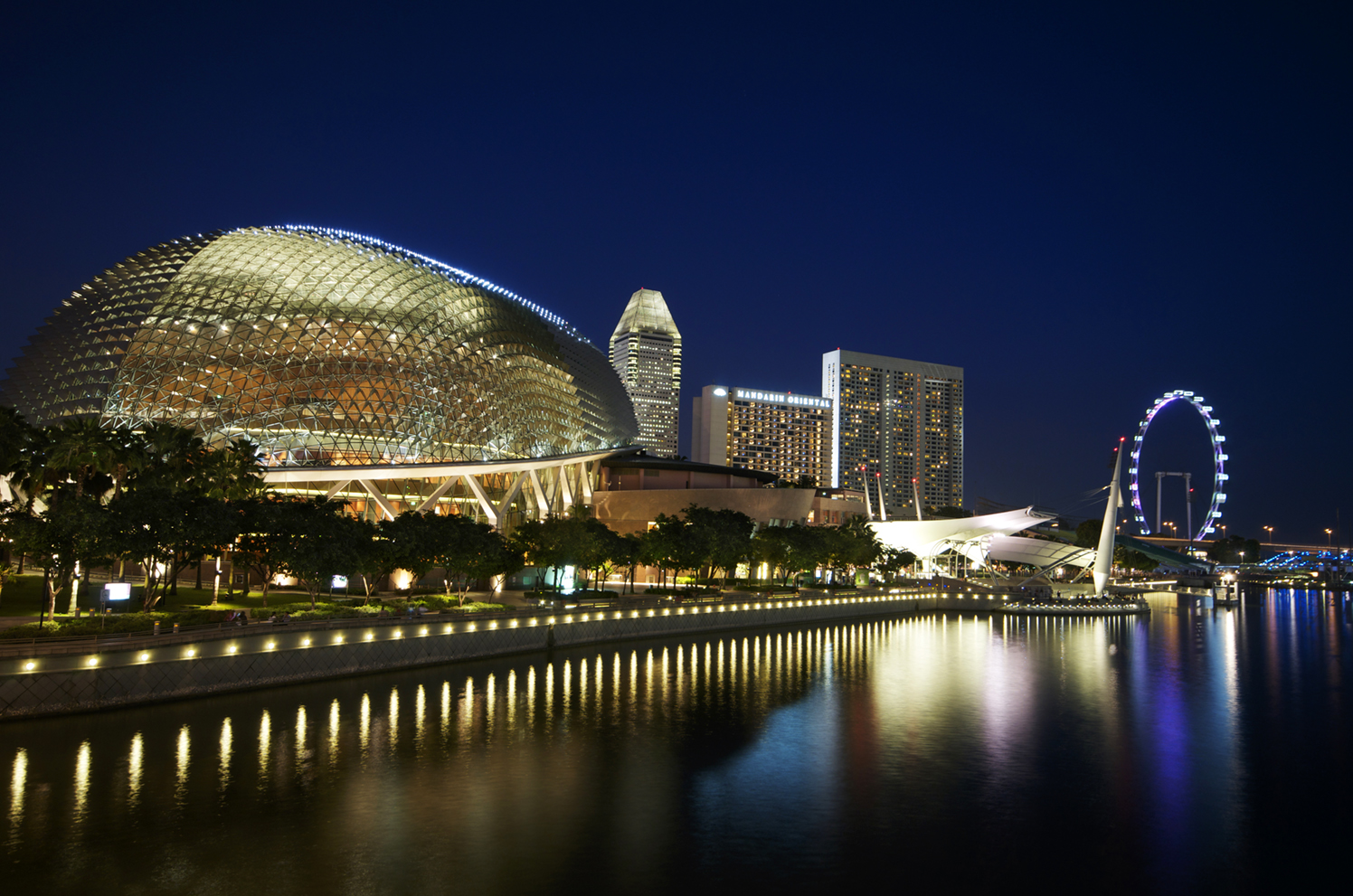
The Esplanade – Theatres on the Bay

- 1 October – The Board of Commissioners of Currency, Singapore (BCCS) merges with Monetary Authority of Singapore (MAS), first announced on 1 March.
- 11 October – Virgin Mobile Singapore ceases operations as a mobile virtual network operator after gaining just 3% of the mobile market in Singapore.
- 12 October – The Esplanade is officially opened by President S. R. Nathan.

=== November ===
- 2 November – After several accidents and two deaths, Fantasy Island in Sentosa is closed.
- 11 November – The Kallang Paya Lebar Expressway is officially launched, with the 12 km (7.5 miles) expressway scheduled by 2007.
- 20 November – A large Chengal Pasir tree was felled by DTZ Debenham Tie Leung. After a court hearing, it was fined in 2003.
- 21 November – Comfort Group and DelGro Corporation announced a merger between the biggest taxi operator and the largest public bus operator in Singapore respectively, creating a S$1 billion company. The merger results in the formation of ComfortDelGro on 29 March 2003.

=== December ===
- 1 December – Magnetic-stripe cards for use on Singapore's public transport system are completely phased out, completing the switchover to EZ-Link cards.
- 5 December – A gender-quota for admission of medical school students will be abolished from the 2003 batch, allowing men and women to pursue medicine as they wish.
- 21 December – The Ministry of Home Affairs and Ministry of Transport announced that an air marshals unit will be stationed in Singapore Airlines and SilkAir for security, with the first stationed in 2003.
- 27 December – Two police officers, on normal supervisory rounds from the Changi Neighbourhood Police Centre of Bedok division were killed when their patrol car was overrun from the rear by a large garbage truck along Tanah Merah Ferry Road.
- 30 December – The Integrated Programme is announced, allowing students to proceed directly to Junior Colleges without taking the O Level exams. The scheme takes its first students in 2004.

== Births ==
- 28 March – Kiki Lim, Singaporean actress

== Deaths ==
- 2 January – Kho Nai Guan and Lan Ya Ming, murder victims in the Orchard Towers double murders.
- 3 January – Fong Oi Lin, murder victim in the Quek Loo Ming case (b. 1940).
- 29 January – Ng Quee Lam, rubber magnate, philanthropist, Chinese community leader and former Chairman of Thong Chai Medical Institution (b. 1920).
- 4 February – Wang Hong, murder victim in the Rangoon Road murder (b. 1970).
- 8 February – Ong Teng Cheong, 5th President of Singapore (b. 1936).
- 23 April – Gopal Baratham, neurosurgeon and writer (b. 1935).
- 30 April – Soon Peng Yam, businessman, Chinese community leader and founder of Sim Lim Group of Companies (b. 1912).
- 10 May – Teo Cheng Guan, former Chairman of OCBC Bank (b. 1921).
- 18 July – Lee Siew Choh, former Chairman of Barisan Sosialis, former legislative assemblyman for Queenstown Constituency and 1st Non-Constituency Member of Parliament (NCMP) (b. 1917).
- 24 July – Rafeah Buang, singer of Malay traditional and contemporary music (b. 1948).
- 5 August – Anjeli Elisaputri, murder victim in the Anjeli Elisaputri rape and murder (b. 2002).
- 27 August – Brother Joseph McNally, arts pioneer and founder of LASALLE College of the Arts (b. 1923).
- 10 September – Kuo Pao Kun, theatre director (b. 1939).
- 26 December – Steven Lee, former broadcaster (b. 1938).
- 29 December – Linda Chen, linguist, writer and feminist (b. 1928).
