= Yap Weng Wah =

Malaysian serial sex offender jailed in Singapore

- 2012 police mugshot of Yap Weng Wah
- Born: Yap Weng Wah; 1983 (age 42–43); Ipoh, Malaysia
- Criminal charges: Faced a total of 76 charges. Convicted of 11 charges of sexually penetrating a minor below the age of 14 and one charge of sexually penetrating a minor below the age of 16. The remaining 64 charges included: 18 charges of digitally penetrating the anus of a minor below the age of 14; 15 charges of receiving fellatio from a minor below the age of 14; 10 charges of having anal intercourse with a minor below the age of 14; 7 charges of digitally penetrating the anus of a minor below the age of 16; 7 charges of receiving fellatio from a minor below the age of 16; 6 charges of having anal intercourse with a minor below the age of 16; 1 charge of procuring a child to commit an indecent act; 76 charges of unnatural sex
- Criminal penalty: Total of 30 years’ imprisonment and 24 strokes of the cane (20 March 2015)
- Criminal status: Currently imprisoned in Singapore

Yap Weng Wah
- Traditional Chinese: 葉榮華
- Simplified Chinese: 叶荣华
Transcriptions
Standard Mandarin
- Hanyu Pinyin: Yè Rónghuá
Yue: Cantonese
- Jyutping: yiap4 wing4 waa4

Yap Weng Wah (born 1983), alias Wai Loon or Loon, is a Malaysian serial sex offender, who formerly worked as a quality assurance engineer, and is currently jailed in Singapore for 76 sexual offences committed against 31 teenage boys aged between 11 and 15 in Singapore. He befriended his victims online, had sex with them and filmed his illegal acts. During police investigations, Yap was found to have raped 14 more boys in Malaysia in between his constant trips from Singapore to Malaysia before his arrest.

Yap was sentenced to 30 years in prison and 24 strokes of the cane, as he was assessed to remain a danger to society with his high risk of re-offending and the aggravating nature of his crimes. Yap was considered as one of the most high-profile pedophile sex offenders who was sentenced to lengthy jail terms for sex crimes against minors.

== Early life ==
=== Childhood and family ===
Born sometime in 1983, Yap is the eldest of three children, having a brother and a sister. His birthplace and hometown is in Ipoh, Malaysia.

Yap grew up in a single-parent household, as his father left for New Zealand when he was eight years old and presumably never came back. His mother stayed and raised the three children by herself, sometimes under financial struggles.

=== Alleged childhood sexual encounter ===
According to his lawyer, when Yap was in primary school, at the age of 12, he had his first sexual encounter with his male mathematics teacher, who performed both oral sex and anal sex on him. These sexual encounters would occur at least once or twice a week, and it lasted nine months until Yap finished school. According to his lawyer, as attributed to the lack of fatherly love in his childhood, Yap believed that his sexual acts with the teacher were acts of love and intimacy.

=== Education and employment in Singapore ===
Yap went on to further his studies after his graduation from primary school. Yap graduated as a quality assurance engineer and starting in 2009 worked as one at ASM Technology in Singapore. According to a colleague, Yap, who was known as "Travis" at work, was a quiet individual who never showed any sign of sexual deviance.

== Sexual offences ==
=== Singapore ===
While he was working in Singapore, Yap, then 26 years old, committed his sexual offences from November 2009 till June 2012, three months before he was arrested. In total, Yap committed offences against 31 pubescent boys aged between 11 and 15, who were not named to protect their identities.

==== Modus operandi ====
Yap typically, through the Internet, looked for boys who lived or who went to school near his rental apartment in New Upper Changi Road, and later in Yishun. He would then befriend his targeted victims online and pretend to be an 18-year-old polytechnic student under the aliases Wai Loon or Loon. Sometimes, Yap would also say he was from Indonesia.

During these online interactions with those victims who accepted him as an online friend, Yap would present himself as an older brother-figure or mentor to gain their trust, and they would chat or message together over several weeks or months. Together with his victims, Yap talked about hobbies, movies, sports, and computer games. He would also find a way to bring up the topic of sex in the midst of these online conversations.

Yap would then set up physical meetings with the victims under the pretext of giving them gifts, playing computer games, or giving tips about bodybuilding. During these physical meetings, which took place in places like his rented Yishun flat, Woodlands, Hougang, Aljunied and Changi, a chalet at Downtown East, a hotel room in Geylang, and even toilet cubicles at public places like swimming pools and malls, Yap would then convince his victims to allow him to perform oral sex or anal sex on them (without a condom), which went on even if the boys refused, saying they were not homosexual, cried, or were reluctant. Except for one 12-year-old boy, the remaining 30 victims were sexually assaulted in this way during these meetings.

Yap would also use his phone or camera to film himself having sex with the boys. When the boys protested, Yap promised he would delete the footage, but saved these videos to his laptop to re-watch and masturbate to. At the time Yap was captured, the police found a total of 2,218 videos recorded and stored inside Yap's laptop. These videos were also cataloged with the names and ages of the victims, and the year Yap met the victims.

==== Details ====
On the 23-page charge sheet filed by the prosecution in relation to the 76 criminal charges made against Yap, 7 charges involved 11-year-olds, 13 dealt with 12-year-olds, and 4 with 15-year-olds. The majority of the charges involved boys ages 13 and 14 – 32 and 20 charges, respectively. Fifty one charges were related to sexual penetration of a minor below 14 years old, 24 were for minors below 16, and one involved a charge of Yap asking a 12-year-old to film himself performing sex and sending the video to Yap; that 12-year-old boy was the same boy who was the only victim Yap never had sex with.

A select few of these 76 crimes were publicly released in certain articles covering Yap's crimes. One of these crimes took place on 4 February 2010, where in Hougang Swimming Complex, a 13-year-old boy was told to remove his school uniform in a toilet cubicle, where Yap sodomised him and filmed the act. In March 2010, a 15-year-old boy met up with Yap at a hotel, where Yap tried to undress and kiss the boy. Despite the victim's protests, Yap performed oral sex on him. On 25 September 2011, a 14-year-old boy was told to perform oral sex on Yap in a toilet cubicle in the Tampines Stadium.

Another case, which took place on an unspecified date, involved another boy whom Yap met and chatted with for a few months on Facebook before their first physical meeting at a mall. After the duo had lunch and played arcade games, he took the boy to his rented room to watch cartoons online while his landlord was in the living room. Yap later removed the boy's clothes and sexually assaulted him, promising it would not happen again. However each time they met, Yap assaulted him again either before or after taking the boy outdoors to watch movies or eat outside.

=== Malaysia ===
Over the course of time during which Yap was preying on pre-teen males in Singapore, he had also extended his targets beyond Singapore and into Malaysia; during his yearly visits to Malaysia Yap would also target 14 boys, all of them below the age of 16. Yap filmed these acts, as he had done in Singapore to the 31 victims there. The offences in Malaysia were also brought to light when police arrested Yap in September 2012. However, since the crimes involving these 14 boys were not committed in Singapore, Yap did not face any formal charges related to these 14 boys when he was first arrested and charged.

== Arrest and incarceration ==
=== Capture and remand ===
In June 2012, Yap's sexual offences were first discovered when the sister of one of Yap's 11-year-old victims checked her younger brother's mobile phone and found SMS messages between her brother and Yap. The brother and sister thus went to the police.

On 7 September 2012, after receiving a police report from another victim that Yap had sexually penetrated him, 29-year-old Yap was arrested by the police in his Yishun flat. Initially, Yap only confessed to having sex with three boys, but the 2,218 videos uncovered by the police had proven a much larger magnitude of his crimes than the extent to which Yap was willing to admit. On 8 September 2012, after he was formally charged in court for 76 sex-related charges, Yap was remanded for investigations. The arrest of Yap brought shock to those who knew him, including his colleagues and family back in Malaysia. His arrest and indictment was reported publicly only three years after his trial began.

It was reported that due to Yap's arrest, Yap's family experienced hard times: his sister was forced to drop out from university to find a job to feed the family, while his brother had to resign from his job to take care of his mother at home, and every week, the family had to spend 6 hours to travel from Ipoh to Singapore each way to visit Yap in prison where he was remanded and pending trial in Singapore.

=== Trial, conviction and psychiatric reports ===
On 16 January 2015, two years and four months after his arrest, 31-year-old Yap Weng Wah was brought to trial in the High Court of Singapore, before High Court judge Woo Bih Li. At the start of the trial, Yap pleaded guilty to 12 counts of sexual penetration with a minor and agreed to have 64 other charges be taken into consideration during sentencing.

Bharat Saluja, a psychiatrist from the Institute of Mental Health (IMH), went to court and released a diagnosic report that Yap was suffering from hebephilia, a type of sexual preference for early adolescent children between 11 and 14 years of age. Saluja also testified in court that Yap's risk of reoffending was high. Tommy Tan, the defence's psychiatrist, agreed with Saluja's assessment that Yap had hebephilia and had a high propensity to reoffend. Dr. Tan also stated that Yap showed signs of major depressive disorder, and that, although he was not suicidal, long-term imprisonment would increase Yap's suicide risk.

In his second report, Saluja also testified that while it was hard for him to confidently say that Yap had a paedophilic disorder or paedophilia itself (sexual interest in prepubescent children), Yap's hunting of pubescent boys for sexual gratification did demonstrate a deviant pattern of sexualized behaviour similar to that of high risk sex offenders displaying paedophilic tendencies.

=== Sentencing submissions ===
The prosecution sought a sentence of at least 30 years' imprisonment and the legal maximum of 24 strokes of the cane for Yap, describing him as a "clear and present danger to society". Deputy Public Prosecutor (DPP) David Khoo argued that Yap's offences had shown a "high degree" of premeditation and through his exploitation of the Internet, he had clearly targeted a vulnerable group of victims, with whom he carried out the sexual acts unprotected in all cases. Not only had he breached the trust of the boys, Yap had also caused significant harm to his victims during the time of his crimes, and had morally corrupted the boys in the course of these criminal acts, which took place over a prolonged period of time and were committed against a large number of victims. For these above factors, along with the difficulty to detect crimes against children, Khoo asked for Yap to be severely punished under the law. While the prosecution acknowledged that generally, caning would not be imposed in sex-related cases similar to that of Yap's unless there is violence exhibited against the victims, they said that Yap's sexual penetration of the boys "intrinsically constitutes an act of violence", and since the circumstances of Yap's case were sufficiently aggravating as to be repulsive to human conscience, caning was justifiable and perhaps even essential, it was argued.

On the other hand, Yap's lawyer, Daniel Koh, asked for a sentence of not more than 20 years behind bars. Although Koh objected to caning in Yap's case, he conceded that if it was really imposed, he said the caning should consist of anything less than 24 strokes of the cane. Koh urged the court to take into consideration his client's period of remand, during which Yap claimed he wanted to reform and rehabilitate, and the fact of there being strong familial support for Yap, which would be an asset to him during the rehabilitation process. He cited that Yap was a first-time offender and with his credentials, he poses as a promising young man and could contribute to society as a useful and productive individual. Yap, in his mitigation letter to the courts, tearfully pleaded for the courts to be lenient to him, as he said he felt ashamed and remorseful of what he did, and felt sorry to his family, who remained supportive of him throughout the court proceedings despite their shock over his offences and sexual perversions. He also made an apology to all the victims he had harmed in the trial, and cited the childhood rapes he experienced in primary school and his fear of getting near to girls after a female classmate's rejection back from secondary school as factors that made him the person he is today.

=== Sentence and imprisonment ===
On 20 March 2015, two months after his conviction by the High Court, 31-year-old Yap was sentenced to a total of 30 years' imprisonment and 24 strokes of the cane, which was the minimum sentence sought by the prosecution. The sentence was backdated to 8 September 2012, the date of Yap's remand.

In his judgement, Justice Woo Bih Li said that Yap's offences were "particularly heinous", and he also cited that other than deterrence, the punishment meted out should also reflect the sentencing principle of “retribution” and the degree of emotional and psychological harm he had caused to his victims. Woo said that he did not believe Yap was genuinely remorseful of his crimes, since from the start he tried to downplay the magnitude of his crimes, which Woo described as "the worst case of sexual offences against pubescent males." In Woo's words, he pointed out that Yap's guilty plea "did not spring from genuine remorse, but from a realisation that his goose was as good as cooked."

The judge also said that the other aggravating circumstances were the high premeditation displayed by Yap and his using the Internet to lure and befriend his victims, earning their trust and breaching it while satisfying his deviant sexual urges. He rejected the argument from the defence that Yap was suicidal since his suicidal tendencies are phrased in tentative terms and will have to be properly managed by the prison authorities. The filming of these acts by Yap also gave risk to the possibility of the videos falling into the hands of third parties and being circulated. He cited that there is a strong public interest to deter any potential criminals from misusing the Internet to gain access to a large number of potential victims. For these reasons, along with the high possibility reoffending, he sentenced Yap to a lengthy jail term to separate him from society as long as possible.

It was reported that while hearing the sentence, Yap teared up, and his family were saddened to hear the verdict. The family was given time to talk to Yap before he was led away from court to prison to start serving his sentence. The family declined to be interviewed. There was no appeal filed against the sentence.

Yap is currently behind bars serving his 30-year jail term. Since the sentence was backdated to 8 September 2012, the possibility of parole being granted after completing two-thirds of his sentence (i.e. 20 years) will occur in 2032, at which time Yap will be 48 – 49 years old.

== Significance ==
The case of Yap made headlines in Singapore and brought shock to Singaporeans since its revelation. Furthermore, despite being in his early thirties, Yap still possessed boyish looks, and his youthful appearance had made it harder for people to believe that he was the one who had terrorized Singapore through his sexually perverse acts, adding to the sensationalism of the case. Due to the nature of Yap's crimes and his use of the Internet to prey on his victims, there were public advisement warnings (including by the government) made for all people to remind them that there is more to be done to educate young people and parents of online risks, in order to prevent similar crimes from happening again. According to Singapore's national daily newspaper The Straits Times, Yap was one of the top ten people who made headlines nationwide in the year 2015.

In July 2015, The Straits Times published an e-book titled Guilty As Charged: 25 Crimes That Have Shaken Singapore Since 1965, which included the Yap case as one of the top 25 crimes that shocked the nation since its independence in 1965. The book was borne out of a collaboration between the Singapore Police Force and the newspaper itself. The e-book was edited by ST News Associate editor Abdul Hafiz Abdul Samad. The paperback edition of the book was published and first hit store bookshelves late in June 2017. The paperback edition first entered the ST bestseller list on 8 August 2017, a month after its publication.

== See also ==
- Hebephilia
- Caning in Singapore
- List of major crimes in Singapore
- Ian Watkins
- Richard Huckle
- List of serial rapists
- Reynhard Sinaga
