= Woo Bih Li =

Singaporean judge

The Honourable Woo Bih Li SC
- 吴必理

Judge of the High Court of Singapore
- In office 2 January 2003 – 1 November 2022
- Appointed by: S. R. Nathan

Judicial Commissioner of the High Court of Singapore
- In office 2 May 2000 – 2 January 2003
- Appointed by: S. R. Nathan

Personal details
- Born: December 31, 1954 (age 71)
- Education: National University of Singapore (LLB)

Woo Bih Li
- Simplified Chinese: 吴必理
Transcriptions
Standard Mandarin
- Hanyu Pinyin: Wú Bìlǐ

Woo Bih Li SC (Chinese: 吴必理; pinyin: Wú Bìlǐ) is a Singaporean lawyer who has been serving as a judge of the Supreme Court of Singapore since 2003.

== Education and career ==
Woo received his Bachelor of Laws from the University of Singapore in 1977, and was admitted as an advocate and solicitor of the Supreme Court the following year. He joined the Singaporean law firm Allen & Gledhill in 1980 and in 1992, he established Bih Li & Lee in 1992, becoming its Managing Partner. Having been appointed Senior Counsel in 1997, he was appointed Judicial Commissioner in May 2000, and Judge of the Supreme Court in January 2003. he was subsequently appointed a Judge of the Appellate Division on 2 January 2021, and took over as President of the Appellate Division on 1 November 2022 from Justice Belinda Ang. On 21 June 2024, it was announced that Woo would be extended for a further two years in this capacity with effect from 31 December 2024.

== Previous cases presided by Woo ==
In March 2003, during Woo Bih Li’s tenure as a judge, he presided the trial of Yen May Woen, a Singaporean hairdresser who was charged with trafficking 30.16g of diamorphine. He found that in contrast to Yen’s testimony that she never know about the drugs in her bag, evidence showed that Yen confessed to the narcotics officers that she was carrying the diamorphine in her bag after they caught her while she alighted a taxi at a Toa Payoh carpark. Yen was found guilty as charged, and she was sentenced to death by Woo after a seven-day trial. Yen lost her appeal and she was hanged on 19 March 2004.

In July 2003, Woo found a jobless man guilty of murdering a six-month-old baby girl after the defendant, Soosainathan Dass Saminathan, raped the child inside his bedroom at his Hougang flat. Woo found that Soosainathan had indeed committed the crime based on the circumstantial evidence against him, despite his claims of innocence. Soosainathan was automatically sentenced to death upon his conviction for murder. After losing his appeal in September 2003, Soosainathan was hanged on 21 May 2004.

On 29 September 2003, after presiding the Chai Chee rape-murder trial for five days, Woo found the Malaysian-born defendant Tan Chee Wee guilty of murdering 26-year-old Thabun Pranee and passed the mandatory death sentence on Tan, who was accused of bludgeoning the Thai housewife to death after he robbed and raped the victim. Woo cited in his verdict that Tan's actions were "violent and merciless" and admonished him for having brutally killed Thabun with intent to silence her. Woo's ruling was later upheld by the appellate court, which dismissed Tan's appeal, and Tan was hanged at the age of 30 on 11 June 2004.

Woo was also the trial judge that heard the 2004 case of Harith Gary Lee, who was charged with killing his girlfriend Diana Teo Siew Peng by throwing her off the tenth floor of her Choa Chu Kang flat. Woo notably made the unusual decision of personally inspecting the crime scene a month before delivering his verdict. He rejected Lee's claims that the victim fell off the parapet on her own volition due to financial troubles, and found that he had intentionally pushed her off the parapet as corroborated by the witnesses who directly seen him committing the crime. Lee was found guilty of murder and sentenced to death in April 2004, and he lost his appeal in September of that same year before he was hanged on 22 April 2005.

From May 2005 to April 2006, Woo heard the case of G Krishnasamy Naidu, a taxi driver who armed himself with a chopper and nearly decapitated his wife Chitrabathy Narayanasamy in a horrific chopper attack right in front of her colleagues at her workplace. Chitrabathy was revealed to have several affairs with other males in the past and the suspected relationship between Chitrabathy and a security guard was what led to Krishnasamy killing his wife. It was also presented in court that Krishnasamy was suffering from morbid jealousy, a delusional disorder that made one suspect about the sexual unfaithfulness of his/her partner based on uncorroborated or circumstantial evidence and it formed his irrational beliefs over his wife allegedly cheating on him. Although Woo accepted at the end of the trial that Krishnasamy was indeed suffering from the illness, he disagreed that the disorder had substantially impaired Krishnasamy's mental responsibility at the time of the murder since he was able to elaborately plan his wife's murder and execute his plot, and thus he sentenced Krishnasamy to death after finding him guilty of murder. However, Woo's decision was ultimately overruled by the Court of Appeal, as they agreed that Krishnasamy was indeed suffering from diminished responsibility and his actions were a result of his irrational thoughts caused by morbid jealousy and thus, Krishnasamy's murder conviction and death sentence were both set aside and he was re-sentenced to life imprisonment for an amended charge of manslaughter.

From 2006 to 2009, Woo presided the 94-day murder trial of the Tham Weng Kuen murder case, in which two brothers were charged with murdering the 69-year-old victim in 2005. Woo found both brothers guilty and sentenced them to death. However, upon appeal, the appellate court determined that only one of the brothers, Muhammad Kadar, was responsible for the killing while the other, Ismil Kadar, was innocent. Therefore, Ismil was acquitted and released, while Muhammad was eventually executed in April 2015.

In March 2015, Woo presided the trial of Yap Weng Wah, a 30-year-old Malaysian engineer who faced 76 counts of raping 31 boys between the age of 11 and 14. Yap was diagnosed with hebephilia, a type of sexual preference for early adolescent children between 11 and 14 years of age. Woo noted that Yap demonstrated an aggravating criminal conduct and a high possibility of re-offending, and had an utter lack of remorse for his offences. Therefore, Woo sentenced Yap to 30 years' imprisonment and 24 strokes of the cane.
