= Murder of Tham Weng Kuen =

2005 murder of a housewife in Singapore

Tham Weng Kuen
- An undated photo of Tham Weng Kuen during her younger years
- Born: Tham Weng Kuen c. 1936; Singapore, Straits Settlements, British Malaya
- Died: 6 May 2005 (aged 68–69); Boon Lay, Singapore
- Cause of death: Homicide by stabbing
- Known for: Murder victim
- Spouse: Loh Siew Kow
- Children: Catherine Loh Yim Leng (daughter)

On 6 May 2005, 69-year-old Tham Weng Kuen (Chinese: 谭颖娟; Jyutping: Taam4 Wing6 Gyun1; pinyin: Tán Yǐngjuān) was stabbed more than 110 times by a robber in her flat in Boon Lay and she died as a result. The police managed to arrest two suspects, who were brothers and also the neighbours of the victim.

The younger of the two brothers, Muhammad bin Kadar, initially accused his older brother as the one who killed Tham and he himself only committed robbery, yet he later changed his story to assume sole responsibility for the murder, while on the other hand, the older brother Ismil bin Kadar denied killing or robbing Tham. Nonetheless, both brothers were found guilty of murder and sentenced to death in 2009 after a trial lasting 94 days.

Subsequently, after the appellate court reviewed the case and found that Muhammad was the sole perpetrator of the murder itself, Ismil was acquitted and successfully escaped the gallows upon his appeal, while Muhammad alone remained on death row for murdering Tham after losing his appeals, including one in 2014 for re-sentencing under the 2013 amended death penalty laws. Nearly ten years after killing Tham, 39-year-old Muhammad was finally hanged on 17 April 2015.

== Murder investigation ==
On 6 May 2005, after getting back home due to her mother not answering her phone calls, 40-year-old accounting clerk Catherine Loh Yim Leng discovered her mother's dead body inside their flat in Boon Lay. The victim was identified as 69-year-old Tham Weng Kuen, a housewife married to her 69-year-old husband Loh Siew Kow (Chinese: 卢绍九), who was present in the flat, bedridden due to a stroke and having overheard the commotion of his wife's murder. As the victim was a familiar figure in her neighbourhood, her murder shocked the whole of the local community in Boon Lay.

According to the forensic pathologist Lai Siang Hui, Tham was stabbed and slashed a total of 110 times, mostly on the waist level, meaning that while she was putting up a fierce struggle and attempted to escape, Tham must have been attacked by her assailant(s) while lying down or in a sitting position, and due to the numerous bloodstains around the bedroom and living room, it could be determined that the attack was frenzied and prolonged, and was a result of two separate attacks by the same assailant using a knife and chopper. The excessive loss of blood from these wounds were the cause of Tham's death, and Dr Lai opined that Tham's death was "slow and painful". Dr Lai also stated that the attack on Tham was more consistent with the work of a lone killer.

Within the same month, two suspects were arrested. Both of them were brothers who were also the neighbours of the victim. The older of them, 37-year-old Ismil bin Kadar, was first arrested while trying to sell a stolen handphone in another unrelated case, and he was subsequently linked to the murder itself, while the younger brother, 29-year-old Muhammad bin Kadar, was also caught and linked to the murder due to his DNA being found on a wallet at the victim's flat. Both brothers, who were odd-job labourers and had previous criminal records for drug consumption, were charged with murder, an offence which carried the death penalty under the laws of Singapore.

== Background of suspects ==
Ismil bin Kadar was born on 27 April 1968 while Muhammad bin Kadar was born on 29 June 1975, and they had at least three siblings, including two elder sisters and one brother.

According to court documents, both brothers only studied up to primary school and were both addicted to drugs; Ismil completed primary six which he attended but did not pass. He was in the Malay stream and had difficulty in reading and writing English (he could only understand simple English words). Subsequently, Ismil dropped out of school at age 15 and started to consume drugs at the age of 17. As of the time of his arrest for Tham's murder, Ismil had gone to the drug rehabilitation centre for six times due to his consumption of Subutex, Dormi and Dormicum.

As for Muhammad, he completed primary school but never went to secondary school after this. He first started taking drugs - mostly the same type of drugs consumed by Ismil and heroin - when he was 15 years old. Muhammad had been charged with robbery in 1994 and with theft. In 1995, he was indicted for theft a second time. In 1997, Muhammad was detained at the drug rehabilitation centre for the first time. Upon Muhammad's release in 1998, he was caught for possession of heroin. In 2000, he was charged for failing to turn up for a urine test and afterwards, in 2001 or 2002, he served a second imprisonment at the drug rehabilitation centre.

== Trial of Ismil and Muhammad ==
Muhammad bin Kadar
- 2005 police mugshot of Muhammad bin Kadar, one of the two brothers accused of killing Tham Weng Kuen.
- Born: 29 June 1975; Singapore
- Died: 17 April 2015 (aged 39); Changi Prison, Singapore
- Cause of death: Execution by hanging
- Status: Executed
- Conviction: Murder
- Penalty: Death

Ismil bin Kadar
- 2005 police mugshot of Ismil bin Kadar, one of the two brothers accused of killing Tham Weng Kuen.
- Born: 27 April 1968 (age 58); Singapore
- Status: Incarcerated
- Convictions: Murder (acquitted); Drug consumption (1990s and 2012); Drug trafficking (2019)
- Penalty: Death (overturned); Seven years' imprisonment and six strokes of the cane (2012); Six years' jail (2019)

Details
- Imprisoned at: Changi Prison (2019)

In March 2006, the trial of both Ismil and Muhammad began at the High Court for the charge of killing Tham Weng Kuen. It was alleged that Ismil was responsible for murdering Tham while Muhammad was an accomplice who participated in the robbery attempt and both brothers shared the common intention to commit robbery and in turn, murder. Muhammad earlier told police in his statements that it was Ismil who used the knife to single-handedly slash and stab Tham to death while he was ransacking the house. Ismil, on the other hand, denied killing Tham and insisted that he was not at the scene of crime when the murder took place, and there were also arguments made against the validity of the duo's statements during the trial.

In the middle of the trial however, Muhammad suddenly and dramatically retracted his confession, as he claimed sole responsibility for both the murder and robbery. Muhammad stated that his brother was indeed not involved in the murder and stated he alone was the killer of Tham, admitting that he did so with the intention to not leave behind witnesses for the robbery. Loh Siew Kow, the bedridden husband of Tham, confirmed that there was only one "male Malay" intruder (in Loh's words) who came in to rob and kill his wife. This sudden turn of events led to the trial being postponed for a period of time before it resumed, with the prosecution proceeding with charging the brothers with murder, although it changed to Muhammad being the killer and Ismil being the accomplice. Due to the numerous twists and turns during the trial itself, the court proceedings dragged on for about three years. In midst of the court processes, Tham's husband died from cancer on 15 October 2006.

On 7 April 2009, after a 94-day trial (then Singapore's longest ever murder trial to date), Justice Woo Bih Li, the trial judge, delivered his verdict. In his 133-page verdict, Justice Woo stated that based on the totality of evidence, there was no reasonable doubt that both brothers were there at the scene of crime and shared the common intention to commit armed robbery, and that the ruthless stabbing of the elderly victim was done in furtherance of their common intention to rob Tham. He stated that despite Muhammad's dramatic reversal of his original confession and assumption of sole responsibility for the murder, he found that Ismil was indeed involved in the crime, and the scene of crime also contained Muhammad's DNA, further placing him at the scene of crime, and hence, Justice Woo found both brothers Ismil and Muhammad guilty of murdering Tham Weng Kuen, and therefore sentencing them to death in accordance to the law.

== Appeal processes ==
Muhammad bin Kadar and another v Public Prosecutor
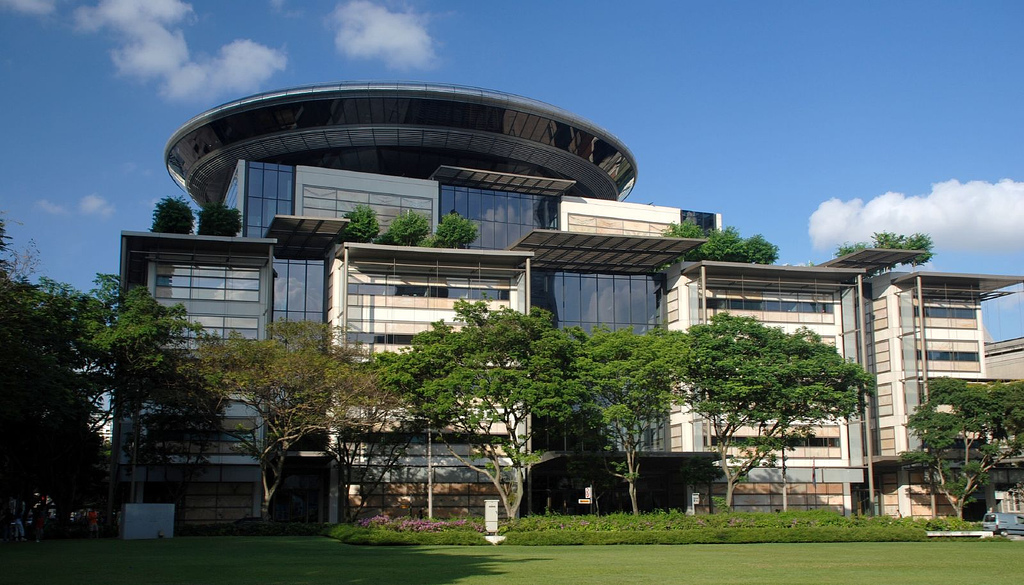
- Court: Court of Appeal of Singapore
- Decided: July 5, 2011
- Citations: [2011] 3 SLR 1205 [2011] SGCA 32

Case history
- Appealed from: High Court of Singapore

Outcome
- First Appellant's appeal dismissed Second Appellant's appeal allowed

Holding
- The Prosecution was under a duty to disclose a limited amount of material that it did not intend to use as part of its case at trial to the Defence at an early stage of proceedings. This would include material (a) likely to be admissible and that might reasonably be regarded as credible and relevant to the guilt or innocence of the accused and (b) material likely to be inadmissible but would provide a real (not fanciful) chance of pursuing a line of inquiry that led to material described in (a). Selvarajan James v PP [2000] 2 SLR(R) 946 (“Selvarajan James”) should no longer be taken as representing the law in this area. A failure of the Prosecution to comply with this duty could result in a conviction being overturned on appeal if it occasioned a failure of justice. Even if Selvarajan James were correct and the Prosecution’s duty of disclosure was merely ethical and not legal, that ethical duty, on the facts, would still have obliged the Prosecution to disclose Mr Loh’s statements to the Appellants’ counsel at the latest soon after Ismil filed his notice of alibi.

Court membership
- Judges sitting: V K Rajah; Kan Ting Chiu; Steven Chong

Case opinions
- Decision by: V K Rajah

Keywords
- Sentencing; Disclosure; Diminished responsibility; Admissibility

After the brothers were sentenced to death, both Muhammad and Ismil appealed against the verdict, and the appeals were first heard two years later in January 2011.

Having heard the appeal, the three-judge panel of the Court of Appeal found that there were several grave errors in the court proceedings and questionable conduct by both the police and prosecution. They found that the statement allegedly made by Ismil when he allegedly admitted to killing Tham was actually unsigned, and recorded on a piece of paper rather than the field diary, and Ismil was not asked to verify the statement's validity, and he happened to be suffering from the effects of drugs when making the statement. Also, they found that the prosecution had initially built up a majority of their case against Ismil for Tham Weng Kuen's murder before they reversed their stance to build a case against Muhammad for the murder while making out a case of robbery with hurt against Ismil, and also did not disclose the evidence of Tham's husband up until the resumption of court proceedings, in which it contained the crucial information that the murder of Tham was the work of a lone killer. There were also no checks of the crime scene for fingerprints in material locations of the house. The prosecution's theory that two persons were present at the scene of crime was also deemed to be unbelievable given the objective evidence that weighed against it.

The three judges - Kan Ting Chiu, V K Rajah and Steven Chong - eventually issued their verdict on 6 July 2011. Having duly considered the evidence and based on their aforementioned observations, the appellate court found that Ismil was not involved in the robbery and murder, given the fact there was no physical evidence that Ismil had been present at the crime scene in the first place, and based on the reference to Muhammad's trial confession and testimony of Tham's husband. They harshly criticized the prosecution for their lack of adherence to proper court protocol and procedures, and not disclosing the evidence from Tham's husband at the earliest stage, and they reiterated that the duty of the prosecution was not "to secure a conviction at all costs" but ensure that the truly guilty ones were brought to justice, and that they should assist the court to come to the correct judgement. On the other hand, the Court of Appeal found there was sufficient evidence to prove Muhammad guilty of murder.

Therefore, Ismil's appeal was allowed, while Muhammad's appeal was dismissed by the same panel. As a result, Ismil's death sentence was revoked and he was acquitted of murder and released from Changi Prison. On the other hand, Muhammad's sentence was upheld and hence he remained on death row at Changi Prison.

In the aftermath of the appeal ruling, there was a public outcry on the conduct of the prosecution and police in investigating the case. Subsequently, while there were no major wrongdoing or errors found in the procedures of the investigation and court process, there were assurances that the police and prosecution would become more strict in adhering to proper protocol during investigations and the relevant court proceedings. In January 2012, Member of Parliament Desmond Lee also raised this question to Minister of Law K. Shanmugam in Parliament, which Shanmugam responded to by mentioning that the latest version of the Criminal Procedure Code (introduced in 2010) included a disclosure regime in which the prosecution was legally obligated to disclose all relevant pieces of evidence to the defence, even if it does not intend to use those pieces of evidence in their case.

In the aftermath of his acquittal, Ismil was hired by his former lawyer R Thrumurgan as a dispatch assistant in his law firm. However, Ismil was once again arrested a year later for drug consumption and served a seven-year jail term with six strokes of the cane. Subsequently, after his release, Ismil re-offended and he was sentenced in December 2019 to six years' imprisonment for trafficking at least 3.53g of diamorphine.

== Muhammad's re-sentencing application ==
Even after the loss of his appeal, Muhammad and the 34 other prisoners on Singapore's death row were granted a temporary respite as in July 2011, the government of Singapore began to review its capital punishment laws with a view to introduce alternate punishments for selected capital offences, which led to a moratorium on all executions in Singapore. Subsequently, the review was completed in July 2012, and it was decided in November 2012 that the death penalty would no longer be mandatory for murder with no intention to kill, and all judges in Singapore were granted the discretion to sentence murderers to life imprisonment with caning. With respect to the drug traffickers, those suffering from mental illnesses or acted as mere drug couriers could also receive life imprisonment, with caning as an option for confirmed cases of drug couriers. These changes took effect in January 2013, and all the convicts on death row were given a chance to file appeals for re-sentencing.

Muhammad was among these prisoners who filed for re-sentencing, with hopes to reduce his sentence to life imprisonment. However, on 29 September 2014, after reviewing his case, the Court of Appeal rejected Muhammad's motion for re-sentencing, as the three judges - Tan Siong Thye, Andrew Phang and Tay Yong Kwang - noted that based on the 110 knife wounds inflicted on Tham Weng Kuen and the admission of Muhammad in court, Muhammad clearly had the intention to cause the death of Tham so as to eliminate her for the sake of not leaving behind witnesses. Therefore, on the account that his offence was the most serious degree of murder, equivalent to premeditated murder with intention to kill under Section 300(a) of the Penal Code, where the death penalty remains mandatory for this degree of murder, Muhammad's sentence was upheld and he therefore remained on death row pending execution, although he still had a final recourse to appeal for presidential clemency.

Muhammad bin Kadar was the first murderer to be denied re-sentencing after the reform of Singapore's capital punishment laws.

== Muhammad's execution ==
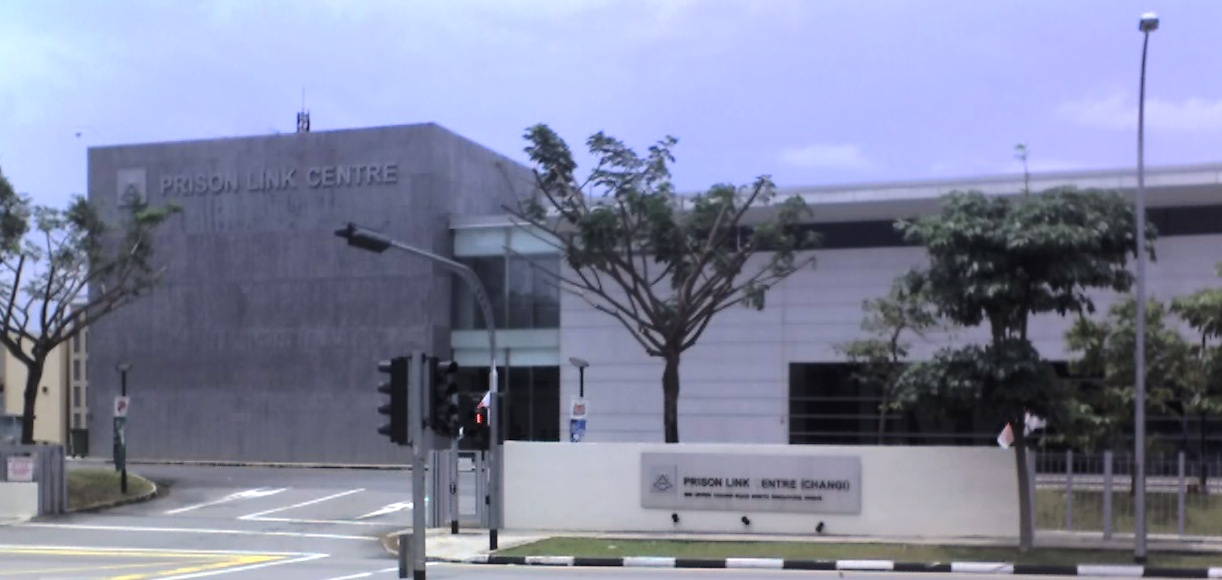
Changi Prison, where Muhammad bin Kadar was hanged in 2015 for murdering Tham Weng Kuen back in 2005.

Muhammad, having lost his bid for re-sentencing, petitioned for clemency from the President of Singapore as a final resort to escape the gallows. Before Muhammad's death row plea, the last successful case of clemency happened in April 1998, when 19-year-old Mathavakannan Kalimuthu, who was found guilty of killing a gangster, had his death sentence commuted to life imprisonment.

However, then President Tony Tan Keng Yam dismissed Muhammad's clemency appeal, therefore finalizing his death sentence and issuing Muhammad a death warrant, scheduling him to hang on 17 April 2015. According to Muhammad's lawyer Amarick Gill, Muhammad was "at ease with himself and fully prepared" to face the gallows, and he also felt remorse for not only killing Tham but also having pinned the blame on his brother Ismil at first, before he spoke the truth out of conscience to prove his brother's innocence.

On the Friday morning of 17 April 2015, ten years after he murdered 69-year-old Tham Weng Kuen, 39-year-old Muhammad bin Kadar was hanged at Changi Prison. At the time of his execution, Muhammad was said to be the longest-serving inmate in Singapore to face capital punishment, since he was incarcerated for a total of nine years and eight months, including a period of five years and nine months on death row. The Singapore Police Force, in a media statement confirming Muhammad's execution, stated that Muhammad had been accorded full due process and represented by counsel throughout the proceedings in his case.

Representatives of the Singapore Anti-Death Penalty Campaign (SADPC), including its founding members Rachel Zeng and Chong Kai Xiong, filed a statement criticising the execution, stating that the death penalty should not have been imposed on Muhammad, a drug addict who had a low IQ of 76 and studied up to primary school, and faced struggles with overcoming substance abuse. Zeng and Chong called for more humane ways to rehabilitate drug abusers and advocated for the full abolition of capital punishment. Similarly, the Human Rights Watch also criticised Singapore for executing Muhammad, stating that the mandatory death penalty violated the international legal standards and warned Singapore that the continued use of the death penalty would increasingly make it an "outlier" among all nations where the death penalty was no longer practised in a majority of them. The European Union (EU) also urged Singapore to reinstate its moratorium on executions and remove the death penalty completely in light of Muhammad's execution.

== See also ==
- Capital punishment in Singapore
