= Murder of Diana Teo Siew Peng =

2003 murder of a woman in Singapore

Diana Teo Siew Peng
- Diana Teo, the 32-year-old murder victim
- Born: Teo Siew Peng c. December 1970; Singapore
- Died: 10 March 2003 (aged 32); Choa Chu Kang, Singapore
- Cause of death: Murdered
- Other name: Diana Teo
- Occupation: Administrative secretary
- Known for: Murder victim
- Spouse: Ong Lay Guan (m. 1987 - d. 1995)
- Children: 1 son
- Parents: Teo Huat Seng (father); Chiok Ah Hoi (mother)

On 10 March 2003, at Singapore's Choa Chu Kang, 32-year-old Diana Teo Siew Peng (Chinese: 赵秀萍; Pe̍h-ōe-jī: Tiō Siù-phêng; pinyin: Zhào Xiùpíng) was forcibly thrown off the tenth floor of her flat and she fell to her death. Teo's 38-year-old boyfriend Harith Gary Lee, alias Lee Cheng Thiam (Chinese: 李清添; Pe̍h-ōe-jī: Lí Chheng-thiam; pinyin: Lǐ Qīngtiān), was arrested for murdering the victim, and his crime was witnessed by Teo's father and 14-year-old son, as well as some of the neighbors. Lee was said to have killed Teo due to the deterioration of the couple's relationship, which had lasted about a year before Teo proposed to break up with Lee due to her unhappiness with their relationship, causing Lee to harass Teo and resulting in him throwing her off the tenth floor. Lee was found guilty of murder on 16 April 2004, and sentenced to death. Lee's appeal was dismissed in September 2004, and he was hanged on 22 April 2005.

== Murder investigation ==
On 10 March 2003, officers of the Singapore Police Force responded to a report that a woman had fallen to her death from her flat at Choa Chu Kang. After they arrived at the scene, the police inquired a 14-year-old boy who was crying next to the corpse of a woman at the void deck. The teenager, who introduced himself as the son of the deceased woman, told police that his mother, later identified as 32-year-old Diana Teo Siew Peng, was murdered by her boyfriend, who was on the tenth floor of his mother's flat.

Soon after, the officers went up to the tenth floor of the flat and apprehended Teo's boyfriend, whom the victim's son and father pinpointed as the one that threw Teo to her death. The suspect, a 38-year-old Singaporean named Harith Gary Lee, alias Lee Cheng Thiam, was aggressive and resisted arrest, and had to be restrained by force. He also repeatedly told the police officers that he wanted to see Teo's body for the last time, a request that the officers turned down to avoid contaminating evidence at the crime scene.

Lee was charged with murder two days later on 12 March 2003. On 26 March 2003, Lee was brought back to court to face another ten charges, which included Lee resisting arrest and hitting the police officers and Lee allegedly harassing and assaulting Teo before he murdered her.

Prior to the murder, both Lee and Teo were already dating for more than a year, and they first met and befriend each other in 1993, ten years before the killing. At the time of the alleged murder, Teo, who had one younger brother and two younger sisters, was a divorcee with one teenage son (born in May 1988). Teo's former father-in-law stated that his son married Teo while he was still living in a boy's home, and Teo was still 16 years old and pregnant with their son at that time; the marriage ended with a divorce in 1995 due to her husband's imprisonment for a drug offence (he was released in 1999).

On the other hand, Lee himself was married twice with three children. He first married in 1986 and had one son (aged 16 in 2003) before he divorced in 1995. A year later, at Kuala Lumpur, Malaysia, Lee married an Indonesian woman in 1996 and had two more children - a six-year-old son and a four-year-old daughter, and he converted himself to Islam, leading to him changing his name from Lee Cheng Thiam to Harith Gary Lee. However, at the time of the killing, Lee was estranged from his second wife. Lee was described as a quiet man by Teo's family and friends, which was a contrast to Teo's outgoing and bright personality.

The case was widely covered in the media due to the nature of the killing being a possible crime of passion, and since the occurrence of Teo's death, there were more cases of people charged with killing their partners over strained romantic relationships within the same month. Residents living nearby Teo's flat were also shocked to hear that such a brutal murder was blatantly committed nearby their homes.

== Trial and proceedings ==
Harith Gary Lee
- Harith Gary Lee, who was photographed leaving the police van
- Born: Lee Cheng Thiam; 15 May 1964; Singapore, Malaysia
- Died: 22 April 2005 (aged 40); Changi Prison, Singapore
- Cause of death: Execution by hanging
- Other name: Harith Gary Lee
- Occupation: Operations manager (former)
- Spouses: Lee's first wife (m. 1986, d. 1995); Lee's second wife (m. 1996)
- Children: 3 (1 with first wife, 2 with second wife)
- Status: Executed
- Conviction: Murder (one count)
- Criminal charges: 1st charge: Murder of 32-year-old Diana Teo Siew Peng
- Penalty: Death penalty

On 23 February 2004, the trial of Harith Gary Lee took place at the High Court, with the judge Woo Bih Li presiding over the case. Jaswant Singh led the prosecution while both Goh Teck Wee and David Rasif represented Lee as his defence counsel.

One of the prosecution's first witnesses was Staff Sergeant (SSGT) Ishak bin Mohamed of the Singapore Police Force. SSGT Ishak testified in court that when he and his colleague Special Constable (SC) Mohamed Shahrul bin Ismail arrived at the tenth storey of Diana Teo's flat to arrest Lee, they saw a bare-footed, disheveled-looking Lee arguing and fighting with Teo's father, who was angered and confronting Lee for killing his daughter. SSGT Ishak also stated Lee smelt of alcohol and aggressively resisted the cops' attempt to arrest him. According to SSGT Ishak, Lee told him he killed Teo by throwing her down and taunted them that he would also jump down like Teo.

Many other witnesses also told the police and court about the events that happened prior to Teo's murder, and they stated that Teo earlier wanted to end her relationship with Lee due to irreconcilable differences and Lee being overly possessive of his girlfriend. One of them was Teo's teenage son, who testified that on the night before his mother was killed, he saw the defendant Gary Lee drinking at the void deck and waiting for his mother, who he observed was not answering Lee's phone calls, and later at about one in the morning the next day, Lee went to his doorstep demanding to see Teo, and appeared to be under the influence of alcohol. Although Teo's 52-year-old mother Chiok Ah Hoi (Chinese: 石亚花; Pe̍h-ōe-jī: Chio̍h A-hue; pinyin: Shí Yàhuā) managed to warn Lee to leave, Lee returned a second time to look for Teo and also kicked the door, and therefore breaking a piece of their metal gate while kicking the gate. Teo's youngest sister Teo Siew Hoon (Chinese: 赵秀云; Pe̍h-ōe-jī: Tiō Siù-hûn; pinyin: Zhào Xiùyún; aged 24 in 2004), who also lived in the flat with her parents and second sister Teo Siew Tin (Chinese: 赵秀珍; Pe̍h-ōe-jī: Tiō Siù-tin; pinyin: Zhào Xiùzhēn; aged 28 in 2004), also stated that she saw Lee muttering about knowing her sister for ten years and him wanting to jump down with Teo, who was informed of Lee's presence outside the flat through her son's phone call.

34-year-old Rita Goh Lye Keow, a close friend of Teo, also testified that on the night before her death, Teo came to her flat in Woodlands to spend the night and she told Goh about the unhappy relationship she had with Lee, who she thought was too introverted and over-possessive and did not give her much privacy; the relationship itself was smooth for the first four months before the first of its cracks begun to surface. At about two in the morning of 10 March 2003, Lee arrived at Goh's flat, asking to see Teo, but Goh's 38-year-old husband Wee Kim Huat, who answered Lee's knocks, lied to Lee that Teo did not come to his flat on Teo's request. However, Lee persisted and returned to Goh's flat to lock the front gate with a padlock, which enraged Wee and led to him contacting the police (after Lee taunted him into doing so), and Lee thus removed the padlock soon after.

The court was further told that the victim Diana Teo went to work as usual later that morning, even though the victim was told to not do so for fear of Lee's harassment. This would turn out to be a final and fatal mistake Teo would make during the final hours of her life, as Gary Lee, despite being informed by Teo's colleagues (including Rita Goh and Lim Kok Seng) that Teo never went to work, suddenly turned up at her workplace, where Teo worked as an administrative secretary. Out of anger towards Teo for avoiding him, Lee pulled his girlfriend's hair and dragged her out of her workplace right in front of her colleagues, who were shocked at the violence and they tried to stop Lee to no avail. Lee dragged Teo into his lorry and drove off.

Teo's two neighbours, Leong Siew Choon and Goh Poh See, who also lived on the same floor as Teo, testified that Lee was the last person together with Teo before she died. Both women stated that while bringing their children home from the kindergarten, they first saw Lee driving his lorry at full speed, with Teo sitting next to Lee. The second time both women saw the couple was when they entered the lift, the couple alighted the lorry and walking towards the lift. The third and final time was when both Leong and Goh went their separate ways, the couple was already at the parapet, with Lee holding on to Teo's legs. 41-year-old Goh, who was walking with her son, witnessed Lee raising Teo's legs higher up over the parapet, but she quickly left for fear Lee would attack her for staring at them, moments before Teo fell to her death. As for 39-year-old Leong, who was walking back home with her daughter, she was alerted by her child that Lee was trying to push Teo off the parapet, and to the shock of Leong and her daughter, Lee carried the legs of Teo over the parapet and pushed Teo off the tenth floor, and by the time Leong looked down the void deck, Teo was already dead with her body lying motionless on the void deck. Leong also testified that Lee was calmly walking to the lift after murdering his girlfriend, before he was confronted by Teo's 55-year-old father Teo Huat Seng (赵发成 Zhào Fǎchéng), since the death of Teo was also witnessed by both the victim's father and son.

However, in his defence, Gary Lee denied that he killed his girlfriend. Lee said that Teo was depressed and suicidal as a result of an alleged drug addiction and her financial problems since she owed more than S$10,000 and even spent money on drugs. Lee denied that he forcibly dragged Teo out of her workplace as what her colleagues witnessed. Lee claimed that at the time he supposedly threw Teo off the tenth floor, he was just trying to cling on to her legs and stop her from jumping off but it was too late. Lee's defence counsel even tried to suggest to the witnesses, specifically the policeman SSGT Ishak and Leong Siew Choon that they never heard or saw the defendant intentionally causing the victim to fall to her death.

== Crime scene visit and verdict ==
On 10 March 2004, the date of Diana Teo's one-year death anniversary, the trial judge Woo Bih Li made the unusual decision of personally visiting the crime scene (the tenth floor of Teo's flat) in order to verify the claims of Gary Lee and the prosecution witnesses, so as to determine whether the victim was murdered or died in the manner of suicide. He also asked to bring the shoes of Teo, which she last wore before her death. After he finished his visit of the crime scene, Justice Woo scheduled to give his verdict in April 2004.

On 16 April 2004, Justice Woo made his decision. Justice Woo rejected Lee's claims that Teo fell off the tenth floor voluntarily by suicide, since the parapet was measured 1.3m and the victim's height of 1.48m (even if wearing her shoes) would not make it possible for her to climb over the parapet by herself. He described Lee's claims of Teo feeling depressed and suicidal about her financial issues as a "red herring" concocted by Lee to deflect blame from himself. The judge also noted the evidence of various witnesses, which illustrated that for the final 48 hours of Teo's life, Lee had been harassing Teo for wanting to end their relationship and avoiding him, and his desperation and unacceptance over this matter gradually culminated into acts of aggression and violence towards the victim. Justice Woo also pointed out that even after forcibly meeting Teo at her workplace, Lee's rage had not subsided and as a result, by intentionally pushing the victim off the tenth storey of her residential block and causing the death of 32-year-old Diana Teo Siew Peng, Lee had, in Justice Woo's words, "sealed her fate and his own".

Accordingly, Justice Woo found 39-year-old Harith Gary Lee guilty of murder, and the murderer was sentenced to death. Under the laws of Singapore at the time, the death penalty was mandated as the sole punishment for murder. Teo's family and friends reportedly clapped and wept in court when the death sentence was passed. Lee's older brother reportedly told the press that his brother had committed a terrible crime and should take responsibility for his actions. The conviction of Lee for murdering Teo led to Lee's second wife and his children suffering from severe hardships in their daily lives.

== Execution ==
On 22 September 2004, Gary Lee's appeal against his death sentence and murder conviction was rejected by the Court of Appeal, with the three judges - High Court judge Kan Ting Chiu, Judge of Appeal Chao Hick Tin and Chief Justice Yong Pung How - rejecting Lee's claims of Diana Teo killing herself after they accepted the trial judge's findings that Lee indeed intentionally pushed his girlfriend to her death.

On the Friday morning of 22 April 2005, 40-year-old Harith Gary Lee was hanged in Changi Prison at dawn. The execution of Lee was not revealed until two months later in June 2005, when a crime correspondent for the national newspaper The Straits Times commented that the authorities should not withheld any announcement of judicial hangings for the sake of public interest that concerned about whether justice was served.

== Aftermath ==
Two months after Harith Gary Lee was put to death, in June 2005, Singaporean crime show Crimewatch re-enacted the Diana Teo murder case and aired it on television.

A year after Lee was executed, another Singaporean crime show True Files re-enacted the murder and it first aired on 11 June 2006 as the 11th episode of the show's fourth season. Coincidentally, in both the episodes from True Files and Crimewatch, the killer Gary Lee was portrayed by the same actor, a Singaporean actor named Christopher Chew, who was the only cast member of these two re-enactments to portray the same character in two different shows. In the True Files version of the case, the identities of the victim and related witnesses (e.g. the victim was renamed Tina and her son was renamed Jeremy) were changed for the protection of their privacies. Lee's former lawyer David Rasif was interviewed in the show to speak about his former client; he stated that Lee was not remorseful at all for killing Teo and even insisted his innocence up till his execution. Lee reportedly told his lawyer that he loved Teo very much, and Rasif speculated that Lee himself believed he never pushed his girlfriend off the tenth floor.

Also, in June 2006, David Rasif was listed as a fugitive on the authorities' wanted list for charges of misappropriating S$11.3 million of his clients' money. Rasif, who had fled Singapore with his ill-gotten monetary gains, remains on the run as of today and was still wanted by Interpol for his offences. His two accomplices were since jailed for the abetment of his crimes.

Sixteen months after the murder of Teo, on 5 July 2004, Teo's former husband Ong Lay Guan (the father of Teo's son) died at the age of 33. Ong was said to have accidentally fallen to his death from the tenth storey while trying to hang a bird cage. It was reported that despite the couple's divorce in 1995, Ong still loved his ex-wife and never gotten over her, and he was still carrying a photograph of himself and Teo in his wallet. At the time of Ong's death, his son was living with him since the death of his mother, and as a result of losing his father, the boy was orphaned. It was said that after the death of his mother, the teenager's studies took a blow as his grades dropped and he had to repeat his third year in secondary school, and he was still sad over his mother's death.

The case of Diana Teo's murder was reported in 2005 as one of the high-profile cases of killings resulting from the deterioration of couples' relationships.

== See also ==
- Capital punishment in Singapore
