= 2003 Chai Chee rape and murder =

2003 rape and murder of a Thai housewife in Singapore

Thabun Pranee
- Born: Thabun Pranee c. 1977; Thailand
- Died: 9 January 2003 (aged 26); Chai Chee, Singapore
- Cause of death: Murdered
- Other name: Thabun Prance
- Occupation: Housewife
- Known for: Murder victim
- Spouse: Ler Lee Mong (m. 2002)

On 9 January 2003, at a flat in Chai Chee, Singapore, 26-year-old Thabun Pranee (also spelt Thabun Prance), a Thai citizen, was raped and murdered by an acquaintance of her Singaporean husband. Thabun's killer, 29-year-old Tan Chee Wee (Chinese: 陈志伟; Pe̍h-ōe-jī: Tân Chì-úi; pinyin: Chén Zhìwěi), who was a Malaysian and an assistant store supervisor, was arrested the next day after he committed the brutal crime. Nine months after his arrest, Tan was found guilty of murder and sentenced to death on 29 September 2003, after the trial court did not accept either the defence's theory of someone else being the killer or the claims that Tan killed Thabun in self-defence during a fight. After losing his appeal against the death sentence, Tan was hanged on 11 June 2004.

== Murder ==
On the evening of 9 January 2003, at one of the flats in Chai Chee, 49-year-old delivery driver Ler Lee Mong returned home from work but upon his arrival, he noticed the door of his flat was left open, and there were bloodstains on the floor. As Ler entered the flat and went inside the master bedroom, he discovered his wife lying dead in a pool of blood, clad in only her underwear and shirt.

The death of Ler's wife, 26-year-old Thai citizen Thabun Pranee (who was married with Ler since 2002), was classified by police as murder. During police investigations, it was found that a golden Rolex watch, some gold accessories belonging to Thabun, and cash amounting to around S$500 to S$600 were missing from the flat. Dr Gilbert Lau, a forensic pathologist, examined the body and found head injuries and a stab wound to the neck on the victim. He determined that the head injuries were the cause of Thabun's death, and they were inflicted with blunt force trauma to the head, and it was possibly caused by a hammer.

== Police investigations ==
The police interviewed some of the people known to Ler and Thabun as part of their investigations, including several friends of Ler who frequented his flat to play mahjong. One of these mahjong partners, 29-year-old Tan Chee Wee, was found to have called the flat earlier on the morning of the date when Thabun was killed, based on the phone records retrieved by the police. Although Tan denied going to the flat on that same day and insisted he was on sick leave, he eventually admitted to killing Thabun during a robbery, and he was thus placed under official arrest six hours after the investigations started. After Tan's arrest, the items stolen from Thabun's flat, as well as the tools used by Tan to commit robbery, were recovered by the police.

On 11 January 2003, Tan was charged with murder. Background information revealed that Tan, who was born in the Malaysian state of Penang, first came to Singapore in 1998 to work, and he and his Malaysian wife (aged 21 in 2003) both worked at the same company and lived in the workers' dormitory while in Singapore. Tan and his wife had one child, who was living with his wife's sister in Muar, Johor, Malaysia. Tan himself was also a long-time friend and gambling partner of Ler and he would often play mahjong with Ler (and some other friends) two or three times every week, and he also knew the victim.

In July 2003, after the evidence further revealed that Thabun was raped before her death, Tan returned to court and was charged with one count of raping the deceased before he killed her. He also faced an additional charge of robbery.

== Trial of Tan Chee Wee ==
=== Court proceedings ===
Tan Chee Wee
- Born: Tan Chee Wee; 5 September 1973; Kangar, Perlis, Malaysia
- Died: 11 June 2004 (aged 30); Changi Prison, Singapore
- Cause of death: Execution by hanging
- Occupation: Assistant store supervisor (former)
- Spouse: Goh Ai Hoon
- Children: 1
- Status: Executed
- Motive: Robbery and rape
- Conviction: Murder (one count)
- Criminal charges: 1st charge: Murder; 2nd charge: Rape; 3rd charge: Robbery
- Penalty: Death

On 18 August 2003, Tan Chee Wee's trial began at the High Court for one count of murdering Thabun Pranee. Justice Woo Bih Li of the High Court presided over the hearing while the prosecution was led by Deputy Public Prosecutor (DPP) Hay Hung Chun of the Attorney-General's Chambers (AGC). Criminal lawyers Wee Pan Lee and Teo Choo Kee represented Tan as his defence counsel. The other charges of rape and robbery against Tan were stood down during the court proceedings.

The trial court heard that prior to committing the murder, Tan Chee Wee himself was facing huge financial trouble. Tan's monthly income of S$1,155 was insufficient to cover all his expenses, including a car which Tan and his wife used to drive to Muar to visit their child. Not only that, Tan was also heavily in debt as a result of gambling on football matches and at mahjong, and even borrowed money from moneylenders, friends and his colleagues. As of January 2003, Tan's debts amounted to S$11,000 in total. It was the prosecution's case that Tan's motive was robbery, and that while he was on sick leave, he had killed Thabun after robbing and raping her, with a view to silence her and avoid leaving behind witnesses to his crimes. Tan's wife was one of the trial witnesses; she testified that she was unaware of her husband's debt, and noted that her husband looked normal on the day he killed Thabun.

Tan elected to give his defence after the prosecution ended presenting its case. Tan stated that on 9 January 2003, the same day he murdered Thabun, after he made his trip to the clinic, he decided to go to his gambling partner Ler Lee Mong's Chai Chee flat to commit armed robbery, a plan which he formulated the day before in order to solve his financial problem, and even prepared several tools (including a spanner, a pair of gloves, a hammer and a screwdriver). He stated that he called the flat thrice to ensure that nobody was at home, but upon his third attempt, Thabun, who was then alone at home after her husband had gone to work, answered the call. Despite his thought of backing out, Tan nonetheless went ahead with the plan, and he claimed he wanted to persuade Thabun to not report him for robbery and ask her to give a false story that the robbery was committed by an unknown intruder who entered the flat after Thabun left to buy groceries. Tan was able to use Hokkien to communicate with Thabun a little, since Thabun, who could only speak Thai but not English, could understand and speak a bit of Hokkien.

After Thabun let Tan enter the flat (as she believed in Tan's lie that he wanted to use the toilet), Tan executed his robbery plan and restrained Thabun by tying her hands. A struggle ensued as Thabun tried to escape the flat while Tan was ransacking the flat for valuables. After forcibly bringing Thabun inside the master bedroom, Tan proceeded to rape the woman, who made another futile attempt to escape. Tan's police statements further revealed that Thabun pleaded with Tan to spare her life. Tan pointed a knife to her neck as he tried to restrain Thabun, and he claimed that he accidentally cut her neck. During the scuffle between Thabun and Tan, Thabun managed to get ahold of the knife, leading Tan to use a hammer to bludgeon Thabun on the head once or twice, leading to Thabun falling unconscious. According to Tan, who added that the victim was still alive when he left her alone in the flat, he never intended to kill Thabun despite having assaulted her and believed her injuries were not serious.

Not only did Tan deny the prosecution's contention that he raped and killed Thabun to silence her, he added he did so as a result of the fight between him and Thabun, and as self-defence after Thabun disarmed him and used his knife to threaten him. Tan's counsel also claimed that it was possible for another person to enter the flat and kill Thabun after Tan left the flat while Thabun was still alive. Tan also said he deliberately left the door open with hopes that the victim could seek help from neighbours and believed all along that he would be caught for only robbery but not murder.

=== Verdict ===
On 29 September 2003, after a trial lasting five days, Justice Woo Bih Li delivered his judgement. In his verdict, Justice Woo rejected Tan Chee Wee's contention that he had only hit Thabun once or twice on her head with the hammer without the intent to cause her death. He further dismissed the defence's theory that another person had entered the flat after Tan's departure to kill Thabun and instead, found Tan responsible for the lethal injuries on the victim. Debunking Tan's actions as those of a "helpful and thoughtful" robber, Justice Woo instead described Tan's actions as "violent and merciless", and he also pointed out that based on Tan's conduct during and after the killing, it clearly showed that he had the intent to cause Thabun's death in order to eliminate her as the only witness to his offences of robbery and rape, and he believed he could get away with murder.

The various injuries that led to Thabun's death also corroborated Tan's intention and motive behind the murder, because there was no reasonable doubt, per the judge's conclusion, that Tan had intentionally inflicted these injuries, such that they were sufficient in the ordinary course of nature to lead to death. There was no basis for Tan to claim self-defence by using the hammer to hit Thabun after she disarmed him and gained possession of the knife, since he was the aggressor, and this was also not a sudden fight. On these grounds, Justice Woo concluded that the charge of murder against Tan was proven beyond a reasonable doubt by the prosecution.

As such, 30-year-old Tan Chee Wee was found guilty of murder and sentenced to death. Under Section 302 of the Penal Code, the death penalty was mandated as the sole punishment for murder, and it would be carried out by hanging if not commuted. According to news reports, Tan's mother was present in court, and she was devastated to see that Tan, who was her only child and son, would hang for the rape and murder of Thabun, and she cried in court. Tan reportedly asked his mother to calm down before the prison officers led him away from the courtroom. Thabun's widower reportedly remained living in the same flat where his wife was killed.

== Appeal ==
While he was held on death row at Changi Prison, Tan Chee Wee appealed against his conviction and sentence, once again raising his trial arguments at the Court of Appeal, the highest court of the nation, hoping to set aside his conviction and sentence for murdering Thabun Pranee.

On 17 November 2003, barely two months after Tan's trial, the appellate court's three judges - Chief Justice Yong Pung How, High Court judge Choo Han Teck and Judge of Appeal Chao Hick Tin - rejected Tan's appeal and upheld both his murder conviction and death sentence. In their written decision, the three judges unanimously rejected Tan's defence, and cited the trial judge's findings to affirm the fact that there was sufficient evidence against Tan for killing Thabun Pranee after he robbed and raped her upon his entry into her Chai Chee flat.

== Execution ==
On 11 June 2004, 30-year-old Tan Chee Wee was hanged in Changi Prison at dawn.

In the aftermath of the crime, Singaporean crime show Crimewatch re-adapted the Chai Chee rape-murder case and aired it on television in June 2004, recounting the investigation process in the case and the arrest of Tan Chee Wee for killing Thabun Pranee.

In November 2005, one of the police officers who solved the rape-murder of Thabun Pranee was awarded for his contributions to bringing Tan to justice for his crime.

== See also ==
- Capital punishment in Singapore
