= Murder of Anjeli Elisaputri =

2002 rape-murder of a baby in Singapore

Anjeli Elisaputri
- Born: 22 January 2002; Batam, Indonesia
- Died: 5 August 2002 (aged 6 months); Hougang, Singapore
- Cause of death: Murdered
- Known for: Murder victim
- Parents: Jalil bin Hameed (father); Widiyarti binte Kartanom (mother)

On the morning of 5 August 2002, a six-month-old Indonesian baby girl named Anjeli Elisaputri was found dead inside the rubbish chute of one of the HDB blocks at Hougang, Singapore. An autopsy report revealed that the baby was raped prior to her death, which was classified as murder. 40-year-old Singaporean Soosainathan s/o Dass Saminathan, a friend of the girl's parents, was arrested hours after the discovery of her body and he was charged with murdering the baby, as well as raping the baby before he killed her.

Although there was no direct evidence to link Soosainathan to the murder, the High Court judge Woo Bih Li found that Soosainathan had indeed raped and murdered the baby due to the strong circumstantial evidence against the defendant and inconsistencies in his evidence, and therefore, Justice Woo found Soosainathan guilty of murder, and sentenced him to death on 15 July 2003. Soosainathan, who had since lost his appeal, was hanged on 21 May 2004.

== Background ==
Anjeli Elisaputri was born in Batam, Indonesia on 22 January 2002. Her father Jalil bin Hameed was an Indian citizen who illegally entered Singapore in 2001. While in Singapore working at a Malay food stall, Jalil first met and fell in love with 27-year-old Indonesian national Widiyarti binte Kartanom, who was then working as a domestic maid. Widiyarti, who became pregnant with Anjeli, stopped working and returned to Jakarta on 24 August 2001. A week later, on 1 September 2001, Widiyarti returned to Singapore to meet Jalil, who had been arrested by the police a few days earlier for an immigration offence. Following this, Widiyarti went to Batam, Indonesia, where she gave birth to Anjeli. Although they were not officially married, Jalil and Widiyarti regarded each other as husband and wife. Widiyarti also falsified some marriage documents in Batam to make it look like she was married to Jalil, and even prepared a fake Indonesian passport to allow Jalil come to Indonesia for the couple and their daughter to start life anew.

In April 2002, when the baby was about three months old, Widiyarti and her child travelled to Singapore, where she was reunited with Jalil, who was then released on a special pass after he finished serving his sentence for his immigration offence. Jalil did not have any money to go back to India and hence he continued to stay in Singapore and work. On another four occasions, Widiyarti brought her daughter to Singapore to visit Jalil between April and August 2002, including 4 August 2002. Due to his low earnings, Jalil violated the conditions of his special pass and worked in other jobs, including a roti prata stall helper, to earn a higher income, and he would send some of the money to Widiyarti.

During her stay in Singapore, Widiyarti would live in the ninth-floor flat of Jalil's friend Soosainathan Dass Saminathan at Hougang. It was known that prior to Anjeli's murder, Soosainathan, who was a Singaporean, was fond of Anjeli, and he shared a good relationship with the girl and even bought diapers and toys for her, played with her and taking her for walks.

== Murder ==
On the night of 4 August 2002, Widiyarti, similar to her previous trips in Singapore, stayed at Soosainathan's flat with her baby.

The next day, Widiyarti, who discovered her baby missing, tried to get into Soosainathan's bedroom to find her baby, as she remembered her daughter was taken by Soosainathan into his room the night before. Soosainathan unlocked the door, and he denied doing so, claiming to Widiyarti that someone came to take the baby away. Soosainathan suggested that they go and contact the police, and they went their separate ways. Later, police corporal Siti Nurhayatni was approached by a desperate Widiyarti, who hysterically asked her for help and telling her that her baby was missing and allegedly taken away by Soosainathan. At the flat, police reinforcements, including Station Inspector (SI) R Venubalan, arrived and they asked Soosainathan to unlock the door.

Subsequently, the police searched Soosainathan's flat. SI Venubalan found bloodstains inside Soosainathan's bedroom and some items (including a pillow) in the room, and he thus asked his men to search for the baby, and the search itself included the rubbish chute of Soosainathan's residential block. Inside the rubbish chute, the police officers managed to find the corpse of Anjeli, wrapped in a brown bed sheet and her limbs tied up. Six-month-old Angeli Elisaputri was later pronounced dead on the scene by paramedics.

On the same day of Anjeli's murder, 40-year-old Soosainathan Dass Saminathan, then unemployed, was arrested as a suspect for the alleged offence, and he was charged with murder on 7 August 2002. Under the Penal Code of Singapore, the death penalty was mandated for all four offences of murder, and if Soosainathan was found guilty of murder, he would be facing the gallows.

== Trial of Soosainathan ==
=== Prosecution's case ===
On 31 March 2003, 41-year-old Soosainathan Dass Saminathan stood trial at the High Court for the murder of six-month-old Anjeli Elisaputri. The trial was presided by Justice Woo Bih Li of the High Court. Prominent criminal lawyer Subhas Anandan and his nephew Anand Nalachandran represented Soosainathan during the trial, while Ng Cheng Thiam was the trial prosecutor of the case.

One of the prosecution witnesses was Dr Gilbert Lau, a forensic pathologist who performed an autopsy on Anjeli's corpse. He stated that the cause of death was a severe head injury caused by a fall from a height, with primary impact upon the top of the head, which implied that Anjeli died due to her being thrown down the rubbish chute from Soosainathan's ninth-floor unit. Dr Lau also revealed that the hymen of the baby was torn, and there were bruises on the vaginal area and other parts of the body, which suggested that Anjeli was raped before she was killed. Dr Lau disagreed with Anandan's assertion that these injuries resulted from Widiyarti used too much force when rubbing her finger over Anjeli's private parts while showering instead of sexual assault. Dr Danny Lo Siaw Teck, a toxicologist from the Health Sciences Authority, found large doses of chlorpheniramine and traces of diphenhydramine in the blood of the baby, and these substances were components of a cold medicine and cough medicine, and based on the testimony of Dr Singam S B, a polyclinic doctor, she had prescribed these medicines to Soosainathan when he came to her clinic to consult her for cough and cold on 17 June 2002 (a month before Anjeli's murder).

Dr Jasmine Heng, a forensic scientist, testified that based on forensic tests of the bloodstains at Soosainathan's bedroom, Dr Heng positively certified that the bloodstains belonged to the deceased baby girl. Another forensic scientist, Dr Lim Chin Chin, testified in court that the baby was bound in a hogtie from the back, and based on the knots of the white ligature tied around the baby, it suggested that the person who tied the baby was experienced in tying. Back in October 1997, Soosainathan formerly worked as a rigger at a shipyard and therefore, he had a lot of experience in tying knots, including the one tied around Anjeli when she was discovered dead. This was corroborated by Lee Hoong Cheong, the previous manager and employer of Soosainathan. These above evidences were circumstantial, and they were used by the prosecution to substantiate the murder charge against Soosainathan during the trial, and it was the prosecution's main contention that Soosainathan had taken the baby the night before the murder, and he drugged and raped the baby inside his bedroom before he hid it away and subsequently threw the baby down the rubbish chute while Widiyarti was outside looking for help and contacting the police.

=== Defence's case ===
However, during the trial, Soosainathan's lawyer Subhas Anandan sought to discredit the evidences of Widiyarti when she came to court to give her testimony. He stated that Widiyarti had the presence of mind to dispose of the fake Indonesian passport belonging to Jalil despite her great state of panic over the disappearance of her baby, showing that not only did she fear the legal consequences over the fake passport, she never wanted to get the police involved in the matter, which Widiyarti denied. In fact, Soosainathan had protested his innocence in the police statements, and claimed that on the night before the murder, he was awakened during his sleep and saw both Widiyarti and Jalil took the baby away while he was on the bed, which effectively fingered them as the ones who may have killed the child. Anandan also cross-examined the police officers, who conceded that Anjeli's parents were former suspects behind the crime, and Anandan also went on to argue that the baby's parents had the strong motive to kill the baby due to the alleged bad blood that formed between the couple after the birth of Anjeli, a fact which both Jalil and Widiyarti denied.

On the stand, Soosainathan elected to present his defence. His account however, differed on certain aspects from his police statements, as when he was awakened during his sleep, he stated he saw a person who may have resembled Jalil entering his room, and that same person took the baby away. Furthermore, Sosainathan even asserted it was the police that messed up the crime scene, and Widiyarti may have planted the bloodstained pillow into his bedroom, so as to direct the blame to him. The prosecution, in rebuttal, argued that Soosainathan was the one who killed Anjeli in light of the circumstantial evidence and his account about someone else taking away the girl was not true, and therefore sought a guilty verdict of murder.

=== Death penalty ===
On 15 July 2003, the trial judge Woo Bih Li delivered his verdict. In his verdict, Justice Woo found that Soosainathan had indeed raped and murdered the baby, as the circumstantial evidence against Soosainathan was sufficiently telling of his guilt for the offence charged. Firstly, Justice Woo pointed out that given the knot on the rope tied around the baby's limbs, it was clear that Soosainathan was the one who did it as corroborated by his experience of tying such knots in his past workplace at the shipyard. Secondly, the toxicological report had issued results that the victim's bloodstream contained both chlorpheniramine and diphenhydramine, which were the drugs prescribed to Soosainathan during his clinic visit the month before the murder, and it implied that Soosainathan could have fed these drugs to the baby with a "sinister purpose". Thirdly, the sexual injuries found on the baby was clear inference to the possibility that Soosainathan was responsible for the alleged rape of Anjeli.

Also, the judge found Widiyarti to be a truthful witness, and he dismissed the allegations about her possible involvement behind the death of the girl, and he also pointed out there were inconsistencies in Soosainathan's version of the events provided to both the police and court, which further made the judge to conclude that Soosainathan had fabricated his account to absolve himself of his guilt and hence, Justice Woo came to the conclusion that Soosainathan indeed committed the rape and murder of six-month-old Anjeli Elisaputri. As a result, 41-year-old Soosainathan Dass Saminathan was found guilty of murder, and sentenced to death.

== Soosainathan's fate ==
=== Appeal ===
On 22 September 2003, two months after Soosainathan received the death penalty for murdering Anjeli, the Court of Appeal's three-judge panel - consisting of Chao Hick Tin, Lai Kew Chai and Chief Justice Yong Pung How - rejected his appeal against the conviction and sentence, on the basis that the circumstantial evidence was strong enough to lead to the "irresistible conclusion" that Soosainathan was responsible for the rape and murder of the baby. Subsequently, after he lost his appeal, Soosainathan's motion for presidential clemency was also rejected by then President of Singapore S R Nathan.

=== Execution ===
On 21 May 2004, one year and nine months after the rape and murder of Anjeli Elisaputri, 42-year-old Soosainathan Dass Saminathan was hanged in Changi Prison at dawn.

== Aftermath ==
Two years after Soosainathan was executed, Singaporean crime show True Files re-enacted the case and the murder trial of Soosainathan. The re-enactment first aired on 23 April 2006 as the fourth episode of the show's fourth season. Soosainathan's former lawyer Subhas Anandan agreed to be interviewed on the show.

In the episode, Anandan told the producers of the show that he personally felt that the circumstantial evidence against Soosainathan was quite strong, especially the forensic evidence of Anjeli's sexual injuries and Soosainathan being the last person to see Anjeli alive. Anandan also revealed that for representing Soosainathan in his case, he was criticized by many members of the public for defending a baby-killer and some even stated Anandan should not have taken it. Anandan, who said he was not paid much for the case, stated that he felt that no matter how heinous his client's crime was, he still deserved a right to a fair trial and representation by counsel during the course of the proceedings.

In 2013, another crime show In Cold Blood featured the case in the fifth episode of the show's third season.

== See also ==
- Murder of Nonoi
- Murder of Huang Na
- Death of Lim Shiow Rong
- Murder of Cheng Geok Ha
- Murder of Usharani Ganaison
- Capital punishment in Singapore
