= 2000 in Singapore =

- Decades: 1980s; 1990s; 2000s; 2010s; 2020s
- See also: Other events of 2000; Timeline of Singaporean history

The following lists events that happened during 2000 in Singapore.

== Incumbents ==
- President: S.R. Nathan
- Prime Minister: Goh Chok Tong

== Events ==
=== January ===
- 1 January to 3 February – McDonald's starts a 40-day Hello Kitty promotion, causing a buying frenzy unprecedented in McDonald's history and several fights.
- 1 January – The Nanyang Auditorium is officially opened.
- 3 January – The Straits Times Index hits a record high of 2,582.94 points.
- 7 January – Four members of the Antarctica 2000 team successfully reached the 4,897-metre-high Mount Vinson Massif, the highest point ever in Antarctica.
- 12 January – The Singapore Management University is incorporated as the first private university funded by the government.
- 18 January – The Paragon, a mall-cum-medical complex is officially opened.
- 21 January – The Ministry of Communications and Information Technology announced full telecom competition from 1 April 2000 instead of 1 April 2002 and an immediate lifting on foreign ownership of telecom companies. This will give consumers more choices and compete with an evolving telecoms industry.
- 27 January – Manja is launched as a lifestyle magazine.

=== February ===
- February – Trek 2000 International launches the world's first thumbdrive.
- 10 February – The Jurong Island Road Link is officially opened.
- 18 February – ST Engineering acquires the Chartered Industries of Singapore through ST Auto, now called ST Kinetics. The acquisition is first announced on 22 October 1999.
- 28 February – Shaw Theatres closes its Hougang Plaza branch due to declining patronage and proliferation of video piracy. Its premises has since been taken up by one-stop furnishing retailer Novena Furnishing Centre.

=== March ===
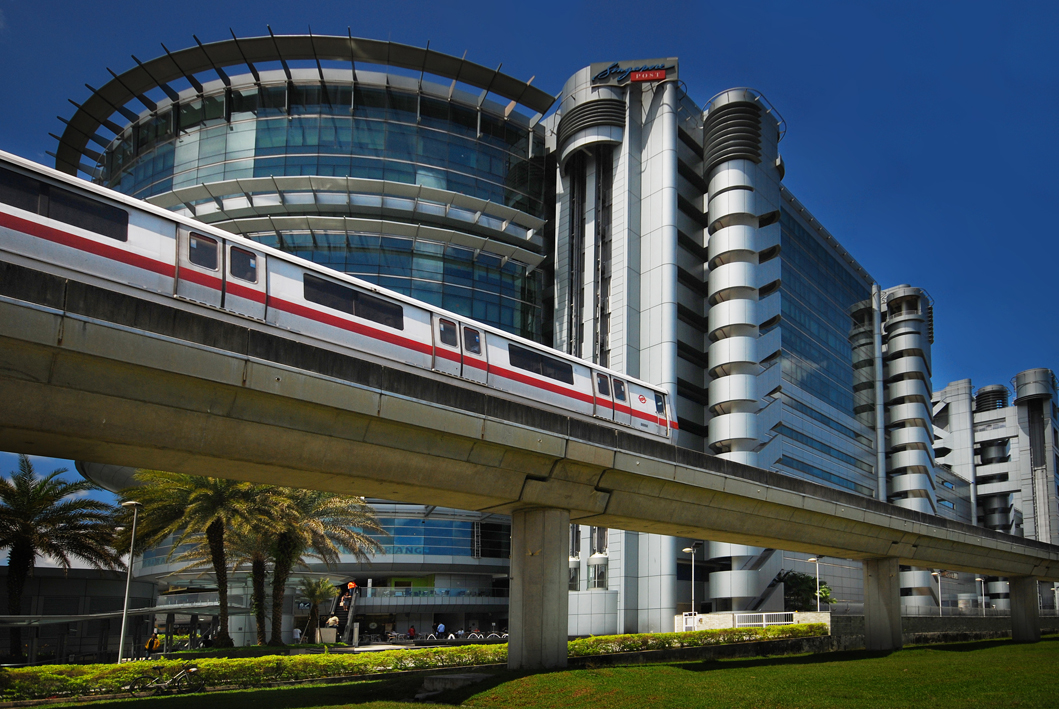
Singapore Post Centre, headquarters of SingPost

- 4 March – Singapore Turf Club's Kranji Racecourse is officially opened.
- 8 March – The new Singapore Post Centre is officially opened, along with the launch of personalised stamps called MyStamp. In addition, the Singapore Philatelic Museum will be transferred from the Infocomm Development Authority to the National Heritage Board.
- 11 March – The Ministry of Trade and Industry announced further liberalisation of the electricity and gas markets by 2001. Temasek Holdings will divest from all three power companies. Foreign ownership limits on these plants will be lifted, with a limit on cross holding generation companies to encourage competition. In addition, Singapore Power will divest from generation companies from 2001, first announced in 1999. It will also divest PowerSupply to Temasek Holdings too. SembCorp Gas will be required to divest from transporting gas if it continues importing and retailing gas to large users. With these measures, full retail competition for large industrial and commercial consumers will commence from 1 April 2001. PowerGrid will be tightly regulated, and an Independent System Operator (ISO) under Public Utilities Board will be established.
- 15 March –
  - The Defence Science and Technology Agency is formed to help develop Singapore's defence with technology.
  - The National Healthcare Group is formed after a restructuring of Singapore's healthcare system.
- 27 March – The Jurong Town Corporation launches its first Technopreneur Centre, a precursor to one-north.
- 30 March – The Pasir Panjang Terminal is officially opened.

=== April ===
- 1 April –
  - The new Tan Tock Seng Hospital building officially opens. At the same time, the Health Promotion Board, which will promote healthy lifestyles will be established by April 2001, bringing together the National Health Education Department, Department of Nutrition, School Health Service and School Dental Service.
  - The Agri-Food and Veterinary Authority of Singapore is launched to handle food-related and veterinary issues.
  - StarHub launches cellular services in Singapore, making it the third telco in Singapore after SingTel and M1.
  - SingHealth is formed after a restructuring of Singapore's healthcare system.
  - Singapore Airlines joins Star Alliance, an airline alliance. SIA is welcomed into the alliance on 7 April 2000.
- 8 April – The National Cancer Centre Singapore is officially opened to treat cancer patients and research of cancers.
- 15 April – Life Sciences is identified as a fourth pillar to Singapore's manufacturing economy, in addition to electronics, chemical and engineering. As a result, several plans were announced, including increasing the number of professionals in Life Sciences, more research and educational institutions in Life Sciences and active research programmes.
- 20 April – The Ministry of Trade and Industry announced that Arcasia Land will develop a new Science Park III at Singapore Science Park, now merged into Science Park II.
- 29 April – The Speak Good English Movement is launched to encourage Singaporeans to speak Standard English instead of Singlish.

=== May ===
- May – Escape Theme Park is opened.
- 3 May – The Singapore Tourism Board announced the relocation of Merlion by the middle of 2002. This comes as the Merlion fell into disrepair at the Merlion Park.
- 8 May – The first C751B trains are put into operation on the North South and East West lines.
- 22 May – The Political Donations Act is passed to disallow donations by non-permissible donors and require reporting of large donations in a bid to protect Singapore from foreign interference.
- 28 May – The Marine Parade Community Building is officially opened, housing a community centre, library and The Necessary Stage under one roof.

=== June ===
- 3 June – Snow City is officially opened in partnership with Singapore Science Centre and NTUC Income, allowing Singaporeans to experience snow without travelling out.
- 5 June – The Ministry of Information and the Arts announced the start of gradual media competition, with MediaCorp allowed to own a newspaper and Singapore Press Holdings allowed to own two TV and two radio channels. MediaCorp will also be awarded a licence to run mobile TV and digital TV services. In addition, the ban on private satellite dishes will be reviewed after Singapore Cable Vision's pay-TV monopoly expires in 2002.
- 8 June – Singapore Press Holdings launches SPH MediaWorks in preparation for the launch of its TV channels.
- 9 June – MediaCorp is awarded a licence by the Ministry of Information and the Arts to operate a newspaper.
- 17 June – The Republic of Singapore Yacht Club's new clubhouse and marina is officially opened.
- 21 June – The Monetary Authority of Singapore announced several measures to separate financial and non-financial activities of banks and the divestment of non-financial activities, known as the anti-commingling rules. Other measures include having separate management and ownership, a ban on cross shareholding non-financial firms and sharing of bank names.
- 24 June – Plans were announced to boost Life Sciences in Singapore, including a review of curriculum, the launch of Singapore Genomics Programme (present-day Genome Institute of Singapore) and boosting the R&D fund.

=== July ===
- 1 July –
  - CityLink Mall is opened as Singapore's first subterranean mall, which acts as an underpass too.
  - BreadTalk opens its first outlet at Parco Bugis Junction. Since then, it became a multinational company with outlets in 18 territories.
- 7 July – The National Volunteer Centre (since renamed as National Volunteer and Philanthropy Centre) is officially opened to encourage volunteerism in Singapore.
- 8 July – Construction starts on the first phase of the Deep Tunnel Sewerage System, which will serve Central and eastern Singapore. It will be completed by 2008.
- 12 July – DBS Land and Pidemco Land will merge to form the largest listed property company in South East Asia with about $18 billion worth in assets. The merger, which is approved by shareholders on 18 October, results in the formation of CapitaLand.
- 22 July – The RSS Conqueror is commissioned, making it Singapore's first submarine.
- 25 July – The National Neuroscience Institute is officially opened.
- 26 July –
  - SMRT Corporation is listed on the Singapore Exchange, making it the first metro operator in the world to be listed, lasting until its delisting in 2016.
  - The Prison School is officially opened to enable inmates to receive an education.
- 29 July – The Singapore Management University is established as the first private university funded by the government.

=== August ===
- 1 August – Wildlife Reserves Singapore is formed, which manages the Singapore Zoological Gardens, Jurong Bird Park and Night Safari.
- 12 August – Project Eyeball, an integrated print and digital newspaper is launched.
- 13 August – The National Football Academy is launched to raise football standards. In addition, plans to attract foreign soccer players are announced.
- 25 August – JTC's subsidiaries Arcasia Land and JTC International's Business Parks and Facilities announced that they will merge, resulting in the formation of Ascendas on 8 January 2001.

=== September ===
- 1 September –
  - Speakers' Corner is officially opened in Hong Lim Park.
  - Jurong Town Corporation is appointed to develop the Buona Vista Science Hub (now one-north), with details announced. JTC will immediately set up an incubator park. Meanwhile, rules are and will be reviewed to encourage entrepreneurship.
- 2 September – The first President's Challenge is launched to get Singaporeans to care.
- 3 September
  - The Ren Ci Hospital & Medicare Centre's Pavilion Wards is officially opened at the old Tan Tock Seng Hospital premises.
  - Bus service 61 was transferred to TIBS from SBS.
- 4 September – Streats is launched as the first freesheet in Singapore.
- 5 September –
  - The University Cultural Centre is officially opened at the National University of Singapore.
  - The National Skills Recognition System is launched as an accessible national skills framework to enhance the competitiveness of workers. It is managed by the Productivity and Standards Board with the National Skills Council implementing the framework.
- 12 September – Hand, foot, and mouth disease outbreak: The Ministry of the Environment shuts Cutie Kidz Playhouse after a suspected fatal case of hand, foot and mouth disease (HFMD) two days earlier with four suspect cases later found from the same centre.
- 13 September – HFMD outbreak: HFMD will be legally notifiable from 1 October to better control the disease. In addition, there are 9 cases from Cutie Kidz Playhouse with 24 suspected cases from Tumbelina Educare Centre and Sweetlands Childcare and Development Centre, bringing the total to 33. The former is shut for at least 10 days while investigations into the death continue.
- 14 September – HFMD outbreak: 5 more centres report 20 cases, bringing the total to 53.
- 15 September –
  - HFMD outbreak: 8 more centres report 54 cases, bringing the total to 107.
  - The new Heritage Conservation Centre is opened to conserve Singapore's heritage.
- 20 September – Tuas Power Station is officially opened.
- 28 September – Channel NewsAsia's service in Asia is launched. In addition, MediaCorp will be listed as a private company soon (it did not happen).
- 29 September – Singapore Airlines announced an order for 25 Airbus A3XX very large aircraft (now known as A380), with the first delivery scheduled for 2006.

=== October ===
- 3 October – BBC's news bureau in Singapore is officially opened, with a new programme launched.
- 6 October –
  - Nanyang Polytechnic's new campus is officially opened.
  - Pasir Ris Public Library is officially opened by Minister for Defence Teo Chee Hean.
- 7 October – Changi Airport's Terminal 3 starts construction. It will be a spacious and lush terminal with IT facilities, with a handling capacity of 20 million passengers per year. The terminal will be finished by 2006, but ultimately opened on 9 January 2008.
- 9 October – The Compulsory Education Act is passed, making primary education compulsory for all children born from 1996.
- 10 October – Singapore is elected as a non-permanent member of the United Nations Security Council (UNSC) at the 55th session of the UN General Assembly.
- 12 October –
  - Singapore's first Internet Home is launched in Bishan, allowing families to enjoy better services on the Internet and convenience.
  - The Brani Naval Base is permanently closed.
- 13 October – The Ministry of Education launches a new sexuality education curriculum called the Framework for Sexuality Education and The 'Growing Years' Series.
- 14 October – Jurong Island, formed by joining seven small islands into one is officially opened. The island is mainly used by petrochemical and energy industries.
- 31 October – Singapore Airlines Flight 006 crashes during take-off in Chiang Kai-shek International Airport, killing 83 people.

=== November ===
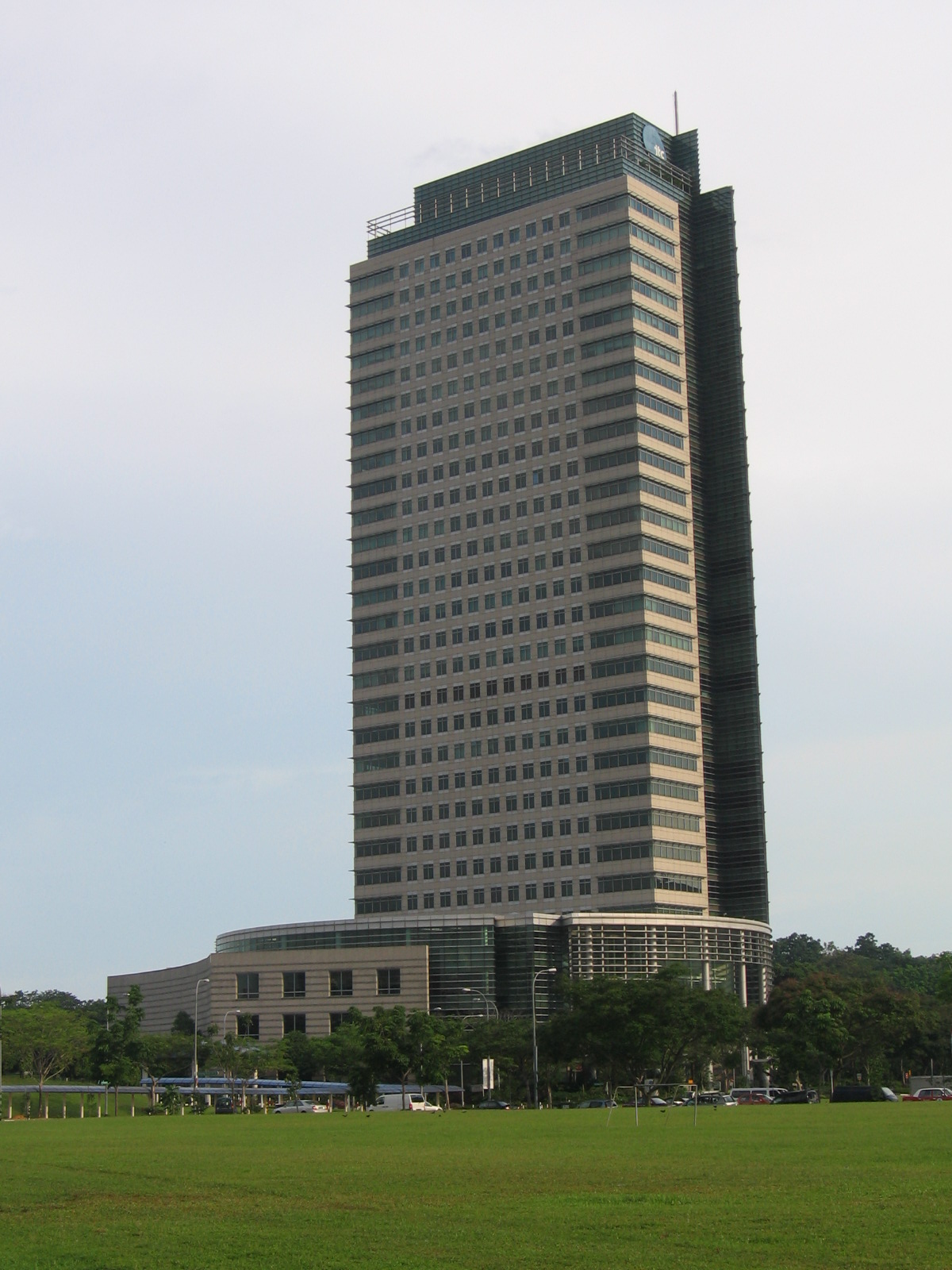
JTC Summit, headquarters of JTC Corporation

- 3 November – Frenchman Alain Robert attempts a climb on OUB Centre, which is eventually aborted on the 23rd floor. As a result, he is arrested, and let off with a warning.
- 5 November – Downtown East opens to the public.
- 10 November – Today, a freesheet, is launched to compete with Streats, another freesheet launched two months earlier. The newspaper is owned by MediaCorp, together with SingTel and SMRT, with DelGro pulling out of the launch two days earlier.
- 14 November – The Agreement between New Zealand and Singapore on a Closer Economic Partnership (ANZSCEP) is signed.
- 15 November – Jurong Town Corporation is renamed to JTC Corporation during the opening of its new headquarters, the JTC Summit. In addition, MTI statutory boards will be restructured.
- 19 November – Singapore's first lung transplant operation is performed on 54-year-old Thanvanthri N. Veerappan.
- 20 November –
  - The Singapore Symphony Orchestra, conducted by Lim Yau, makes a new recording of the national anthem, Majulah Singapura at the Victoria Concert Hall.
  - The National Healthcare Group is officially inaugurated. More GPs will join NHG Polyclinics from January 2001 with a pilot night clinic project in Jurong.
- 23 November – The Singapore Exchange lists its shares on the stock exchange, becoming the third in Asia to do so.
- 24 November – The Airport Logistics Park is officially launched.
- 25 November –
  - Tuas South Incineration Plant is officially opened, making it the fourth incineration plant in Singapore.
  - The Ministry of Education announced a new Life Sciences curriculum to encourage future economic development and understanding.
- 28 November – CapitaLand is officially launched, being created from a merger between DBS Land and Pidemco Land.
- 30 November – JTC Corporation launches the first iPark 21 development in Paya Lebar.

=== December ===
- 7 December – PSA Corporation sets up The HarbourFront Limited (present day Mapletree) to spearhead development of PSA's properties.
- 18 December – The Currency House is officially opened.
- 28 December – A contract for the Circle MRT line is awarded to a consortium, with Alstom handling trains and ST Electronics handling the line's systems.

== Births ==
- 2 August – Tahsh Khemlani, Singaporean musician
- 14 October – Jarrell Huang, Singaporean singer and actor
- 20 December – Quah Jing Wen, swimmer

== Deaths ==
- 9 January – Ivan Baptist, former PAP Member of Parliament for Potong Pasir Constituency (b. 1935).
- 18 January – Jacob Ballas, stockbroker and philanthropist (b. 1921).
- 14 February – Linda Chua, murder and rape victim of an unsolved case (b. 1972).
- 21 February – Chao Tzee Cheng, forensic pathologist (b. 1934).
- 1 March – Low Ing Sing, a pioneer of the Mandarin drama and theatre in Singapore (b. 1924).
- 3 April – James Puthucheary, former Barisan Sosialis politician and 4th Chairman of the Central Provident Fund Board (b. 1922).
- 17 May – Leong Fook Weng, murder victim of See Chee Keong, Robson Tay Teik Chai, Lim Hin Teck, and Ong Chin Huat (b. 1964).
- 15 June – Ong Huay Dee, murder victim of Khwan-On Natthaphon (b. 1935).
- 8 August – Koh Ngiap Yong, murder victim of Wan Kamil Mohamed Shafian, Ibrahim Mohamed, and Rosli Ahmat (b. 1958).
- 26 August – Jahabar Sathick, murder victim of Wan Kamil Mohamed Shafian and Ibrahim Mohamed (b. 1961).
- 3 September – C. K. Tang, founder of Tangs department stores (b. 1901).
- 11 November – N. Palanivelu, poet (b. 1908).
- 7 December – John Cruz Corera, former Workers' Party city councillor for Delta Constituency (b. 1916).
