= Limited-access road =

Type of highway

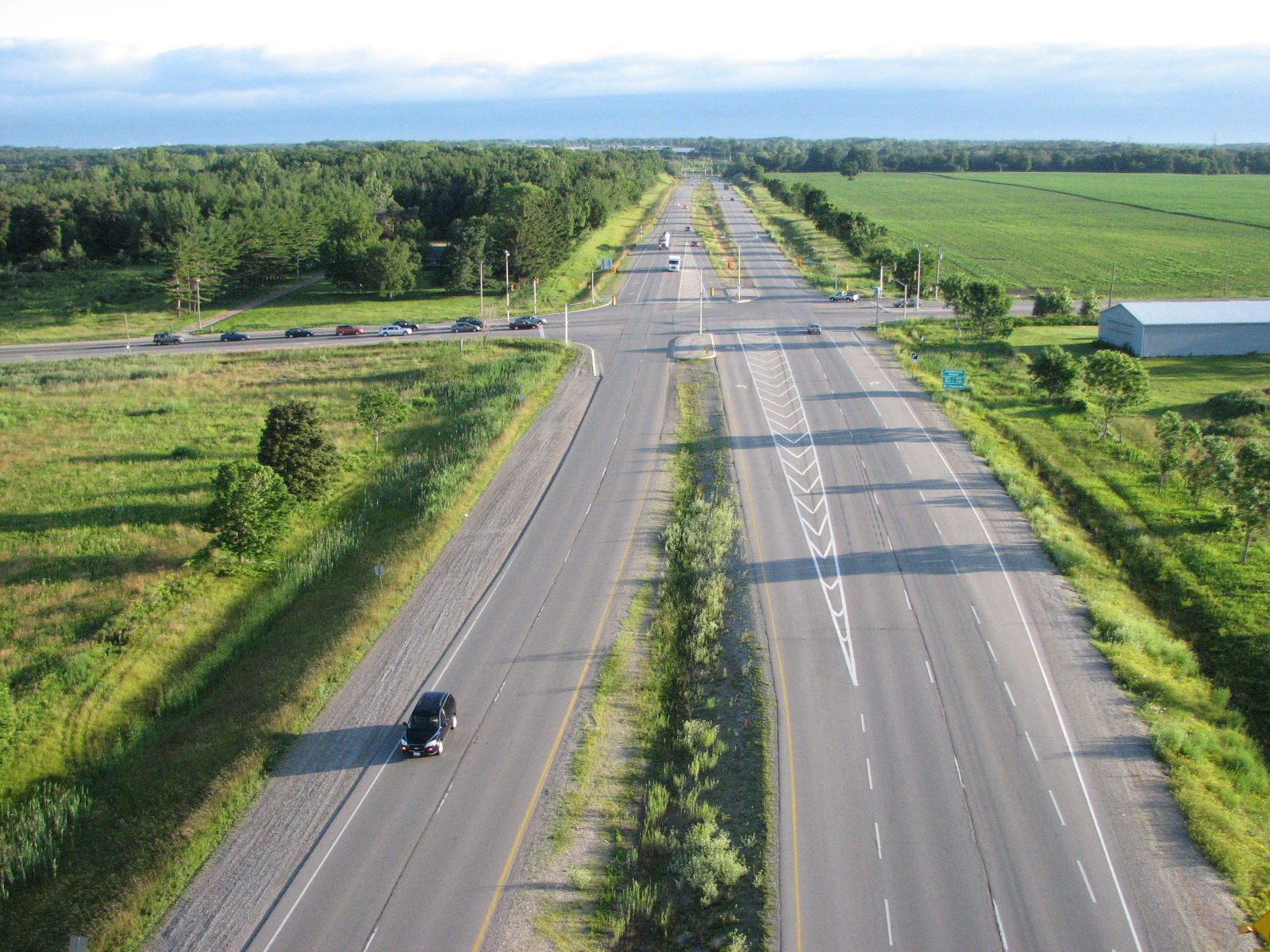
The Veterans Memorial Parkway in London, Ontario is a modern at-grade limited-access road with intersections

A limited-access road, known by various terms worldwide, including limited-access highway, partial controlled-access highway, and expressway, is a highway or arterial road for high-speed traffic which has many or most characteristics of a controlled-access highway (also known as a freeway or motorway), including limited or no access to adjacent property; some degree of separation of opposing traffic flow (often being dual carriageways); use of grade separated interchanges to some extent; prohibition of slow modes of transport, such as bicycles, horse-drawn vehicles or ridden horses, or self-propelled agricultural machines; and very few or no intersecting cross-streets or level crossings. The degree of isolation from local traffic allowed varies between countries and regions. The precise definition of these terms varies by jurisdiction.

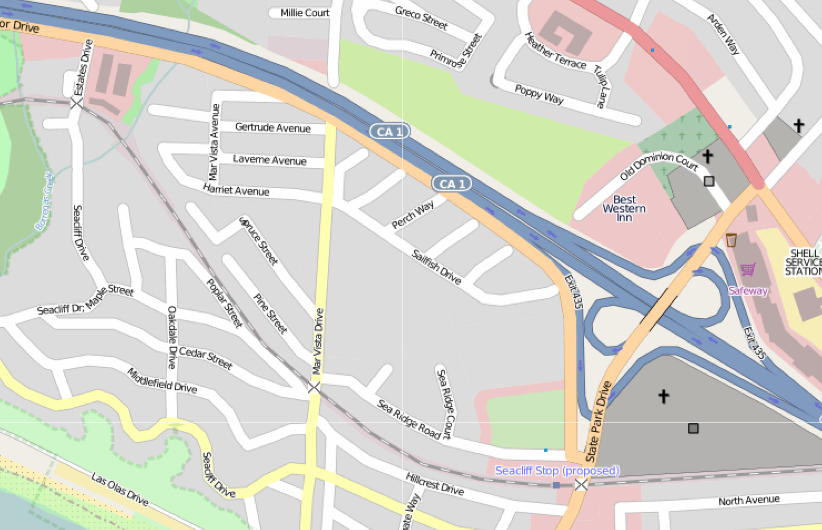
California State Route 1 is shown with parallel service roads for local traffic in the Aptos area. (Map source: OpenStreetMap)

== History ==
The first implementations of limited-access roadways in the United States were the Bronx River Parkway and Long Island Motor Parkway in New York, in 1907. The New York State Parkway System was constructed as a network of high-speed roads in and around New York City. The first limited access highway built is thought to be the privately built Long Island Motor Parkway in Long Island, New York. The Southern State Parkway opened in 1927, while the Long Island Motor Parkway was closed in 1937 and replaced by the Northern State Parkway (opened in 1931) and the contiguous Grand Central Parkway (opened in 1936).

== Regional implementations ==
In the United States, the national Manual on Uniform Traffic Control Devices (MUTCD) uses "full control of access" only for freeways. Expressways are defined as having "partial control of access" (or semi-controlled access). This means that major roads typically use interchanges and commercial development is accessed via cross roads or frontage roads, while minor roads can cross at grade and farms can have direct access, some may be two lanes. It also states that freeways and expressways have to be divided highways. This definition is also used by some states, some of which also restrict freeways only to motor vehicles capable of maintaining a certain speed. Some other states use "controlled access" to mean a higher standard than "limited access", while others reverse the two terms.

=== Oceania ===
==== Australia ====
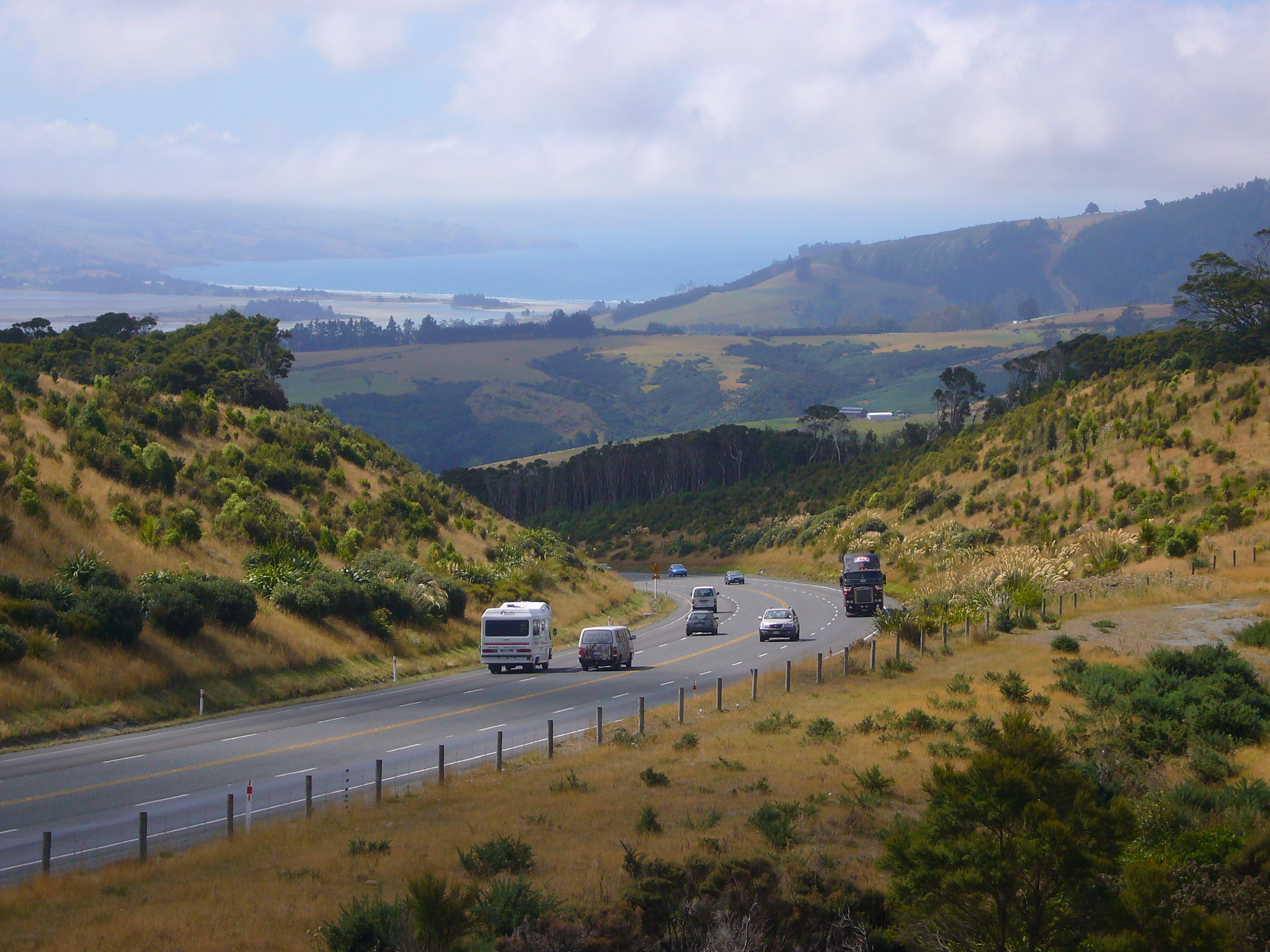
The Dunedin Northern Motorway, a typical non-freeway-type motorway in New Zealand

While Australia's larger capital cities feature controlled-access highway networks, the smaller metropolitan areas mostly rely on limited-access highways for high-speed local traffic.

In South Australia the terms "expressway" and "freeway" can be synonymous. The Southern and Northern Expressways are both controlled-access highways. However, perhaps confusingly, the Port River Expressway is a limited-access highway.

Dual carriageways that connect capital cities and regional centres, such as the M31 Hume Highway between Sydney and Melbourne, are almost all limited-access highways. In spite of this, 'freeway' terminology is used on signage for most regional limited access highways in the state of Victoria.

==== New Zealand: Expressway, Motorway ====

The terms Motorway and Expressway in New Zealand both encompass multi-lane divided freeways as well as narrower 2 to 4-lane undivided expressways with varying degrees of grade separation; the difference being that in New Zealand a Motorway has certain additional legal traffic restrictions.

=== Asia ===
==== China ====
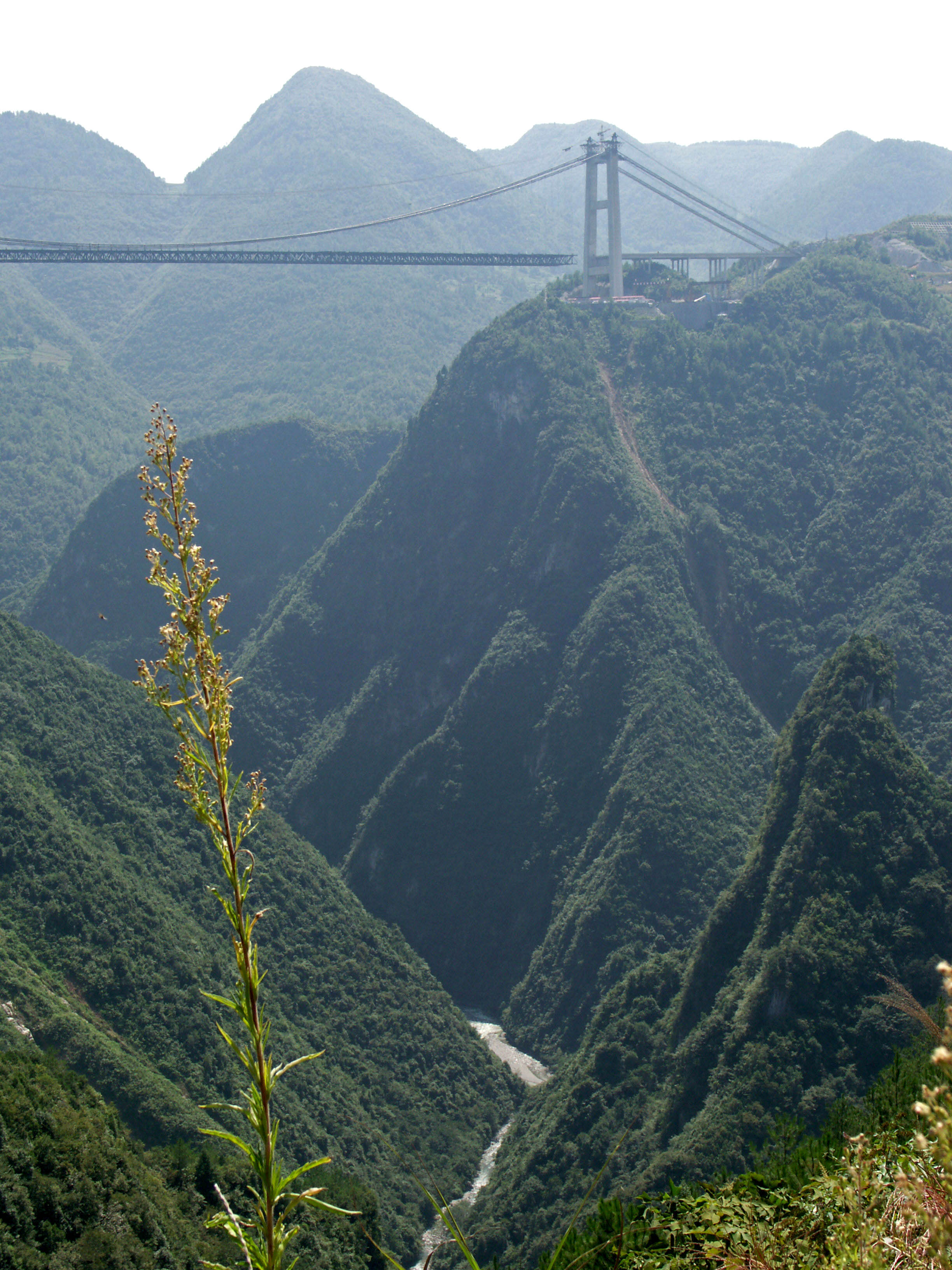
G50 Huyu Expressway crossing over the Si Du River Bridge in Enshi Prefecture, Hubei, China.

The China National Highways (CNH/Guodao) (simplified Chinese: 中华人民共和国国道; traditional Chinese: 中華人民共和國國道; pinyin: Zhōnghuá Rénmín Gònghéguó Guódào) is a network of trunk roads across mainland China.

As of 2024, the network encompasses over 1.9 million kilometers of highways, making it one of the most extensive in the world. Key milestones include the completion of major expressways by 2008 and ongoing expansions to enhance connectivity, especially in western and less developed areas.

Apart from the expressways of China that were planned and constructed later, most of the CNH are not controlled-access highways.

==== Pakistan ====
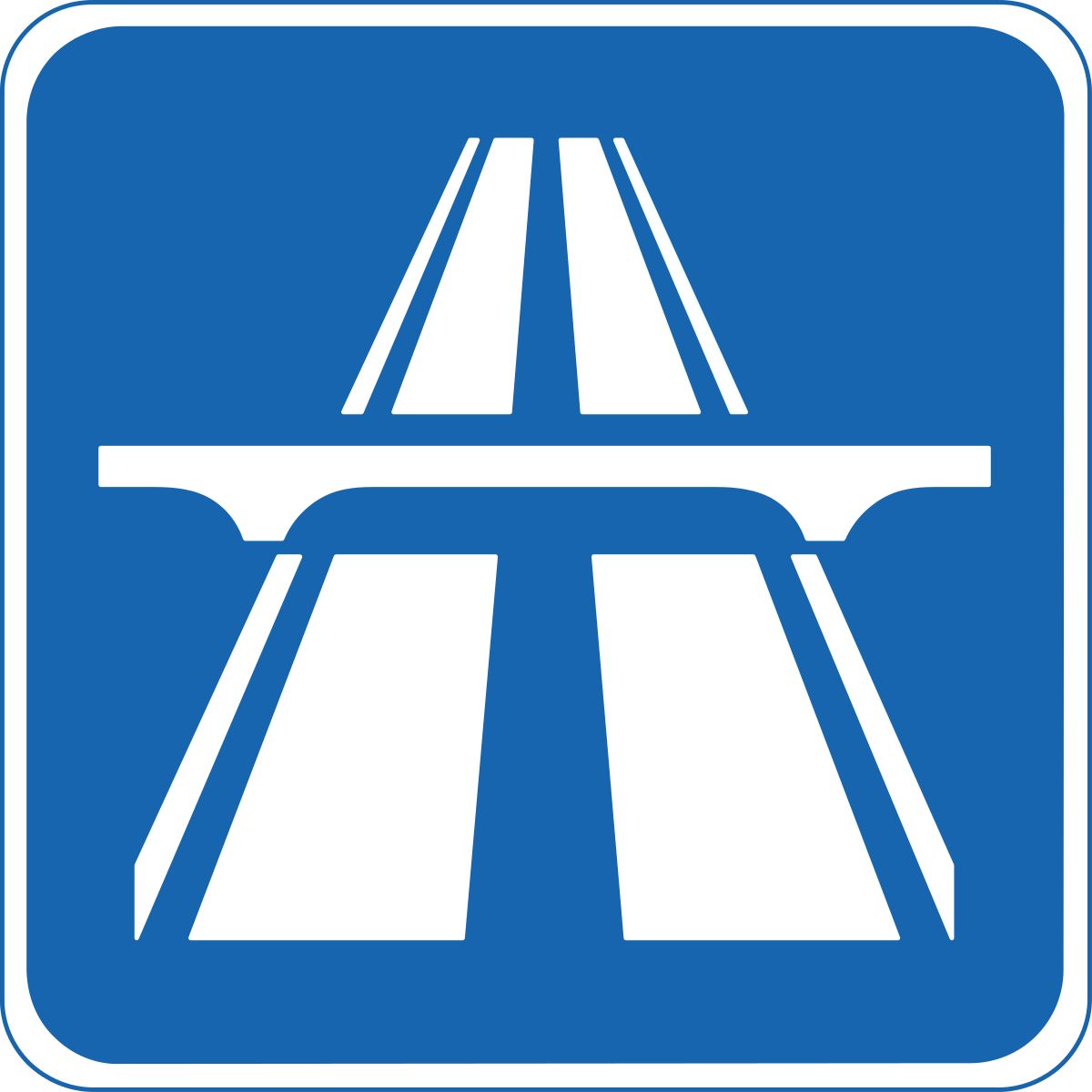
Symbol used for motorways in Pakistan

The Expressways of Pakistan are a network of multiple-lane, high-speed highways in Pakistan, which are owned, maintained and operated federally by Pakistan's National Highway Authority. They are one class lower than the country's motorways and are usually upgraded versions of the national highways. The total length of Pakistan's expressways is 260 km (160 mi) as of November, 2016. Around 770 km (480 mi) of expressways are currently under construction in different parts of country. Most of these expressways will be complete between 2017 and 2020.

==== India ====
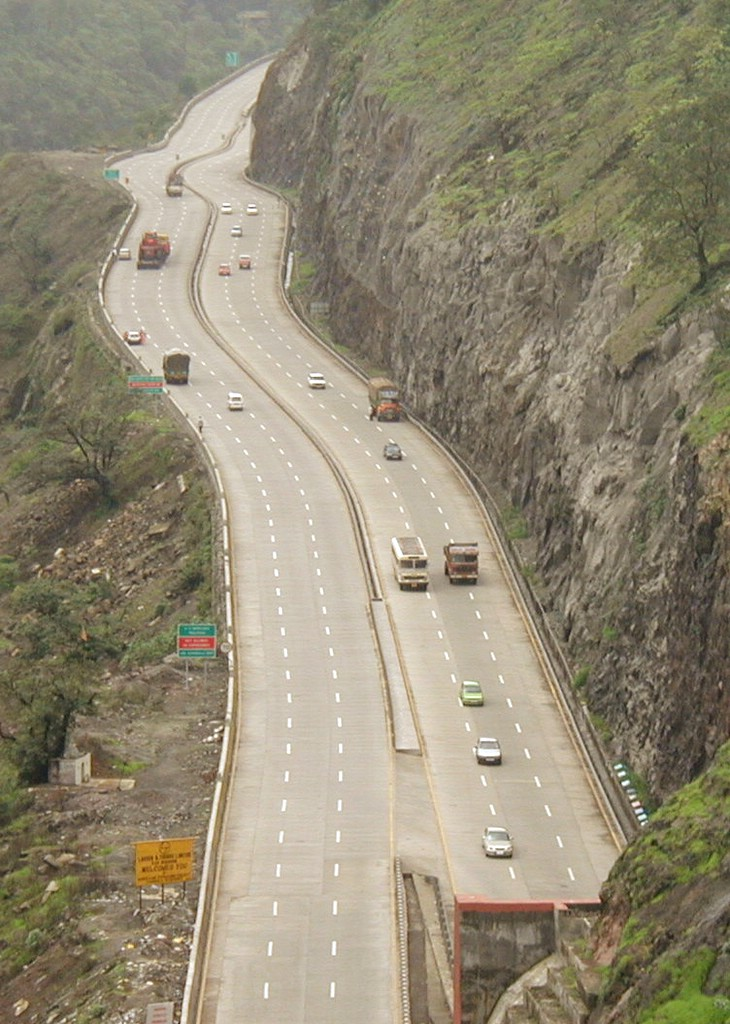
The Mumbai-Pune Expressway as seen from Khandala

The national highways in India are a network of limited access roads owned by the Ministry of Road Transport and Highways. National highways have flyover access or some grade-separation. However, they should be distinguished from expressways in that they are not completely grade-separated.

Expressways in India make up more than 5,579 km (3,467 mi) of the Indian National Highway System on which they are the highest class of road. The National Highways Development Project is underway to add an additional 18,637 km (11,580 mi) of expressways to the network by the year 2023.

==== Iran ====

Expressways in Iran are one class lower than freeways and are used in large urban areas such as Isfahan, Mashhad, or Tehran and between other important cities (Usually two province capitals) in rural and desert areas. The speed limit in Urban areas is between 50–70 km/h (31–43 mph) and in rural and desert areas between 90–110 km/h (56–68 mph).

==== Japan ====

The term expressway as used in English in Japan refers to both freeway-style highways and narrower, more winding, often undivided Regional High-Standard Highways 地域高規格道路 (ちいきこうきかくどうろ, chiiki kōkikaku dōro). Both types of expressways have a combined length of 10,021 km (6,227 mi) as of April 2012.

==== Malaysia ====
Limited-access roads in Malaysia usually, but not always, take the name highway (Malay: lebuhraya – this is also the name for expressways). Highways normally have a lower speed limit than expressways (but still higher than the rest of the local road network), and permit at-grade intersections and junctions to residential roads and shopfronts, although grade separation is still typical. Highways are normally toll-free and are owned and operated by the federal government. Notable examples of limited-access roads are the Federal Highway, Skudai Highway, Gelugor Highway, Kuantan Bypass and Kuching Bypass.

==== Philippines ====
Limited-access roads in the Philippines are called expressways, which can refer to both highways built to freeway standard and are often tolled, as well as lower-standard highways with partial grade separation. The former are designated controlled-access highways (HSH-1), while the latter are designated regional high-standard highways (HSH-2). The Philippine expressway network as of 2025 is entirely formed of tolled controlled-access highways, with no HSH-2 expressways being implemented yet.

==== Singapore ====
Limited-access roads in Singapore are formally known as semi-expressways (in contrast to controlled-access highways which are known as expressways). While still functioning as high-speed roads, semi-expressways may still have at-grade intersections with traffic lights, and speed limits are not uniform. Grade separation is, however, still typical at major junctions. Five roads have been designated as semi-expressways: Bukit Timah Road, Jurong Island Highway, Nicoll Highway, Outer Ring Road System and West Coast Highway.

==== South Korea ====
Motorways in South Korea (자동차 전용 도로, jadongcha jeonyong doro, literally 'motor vehicle-only road') include various grades of highways other than expressways. Contrary to the expressway in South Korea, the status of motorway is a measure of traffic control rather than a class of road. For example, Jayu-ro is a segment of national route 77 as well as a motorway. As of June 2011, 1,610 km of highways in total were designated as motorways. (1,052 km national highways, 351 km metropolitan highways, 185 km regional highways and 20 km municipal highways)

Like on expressways, motorcycles are not permitted.

==== Taiwan (R.O.C.) ====

Expressways in Taiwan may be controlled-access highways similar to National Freeways or limited-access roads. Most have Provincial (as opposed to National) Highway status, although some are built and maintained by cities. All provincial expressways run east–west except for Provincial Highway No. 61, which runs north–south along the west coast. Some provincial expressway routes are still under construction.

=== Europe ===
==== Austria: Schnellstraße ====

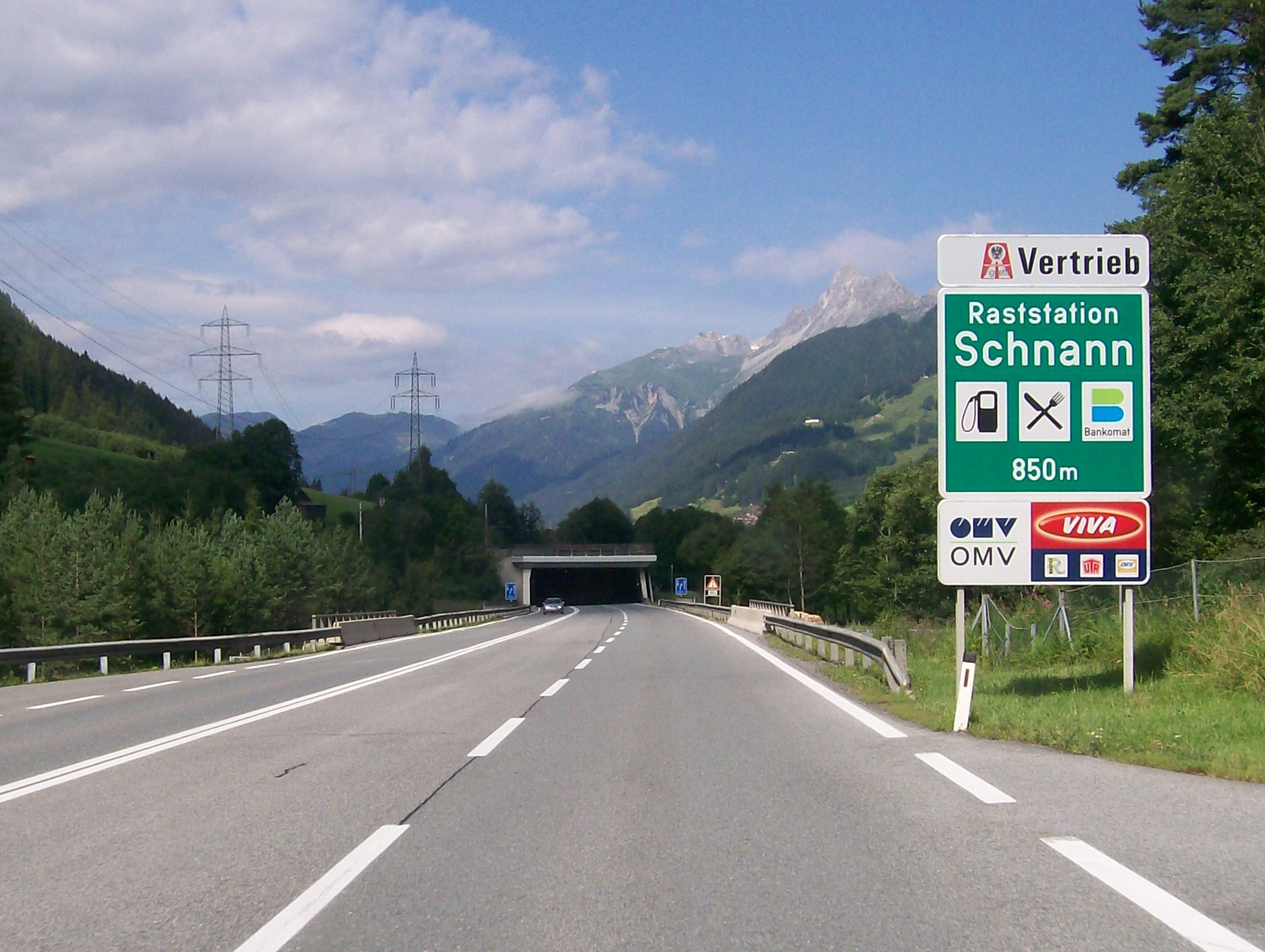
Arlberg Schnellstrasse (S16) near Schnann, Austria

In Austria the speed limit on a Schnellstraße is 100–130 km/h (62–81 mph). Schnellstraßen are very similar to Austrian Autobahnen (freeways/motorways); the chief difference is that they are more cheaply built with smaller curve radius, often undivided and have fewer bridges and tunnels.

==== Belgium: Autoweg ====

In Belgium an autoweg is a public road, the beginning of which is indicated by the first signboard (F9) and the end by the second sign (F11).

An important difference with an autosnelweg is that crossroads as well as traffic lights can be on an autoweg.

In Belgium there is no specific speed regulation for an autoweg.

Only motor vehicles and their trailers (with the exception of mopeds), agricultural vehicles and the towing of fairground vehicles, as well as four-wheelers (without passenger compartment), are allowed to drive on an autoweg.

An autoweg can consist of two or more lanes. The driving directions can be separated by a roadmarking, or by a central reservation. If a public road (autosnelweg, autoweg, weg) consists of two or more lanes that are clearly separated from each other by a roadside or a space that is not accessible to vehicles, the drivers may not drive on the lane opposite to them.

==== Croatia: Brza cesta ====

In Croatia, the term brza cesta (lit. "fast road") is used to describe a motor vehicle-only road, usually grade-separated, without an emergency lane, with a speed limit of 110 km/h (68 mph), although it can be lowered, usually to 70 or 90 km/h (43 or 56 mph). They range from 2+2 lane dual carriageways with grade-separated intersections and 110 km/h (68 mph) speed limit (D2 in Osijek), four or six-lane urban streets with at-grade intersections with traffic lights (D1 in Karlovac) or two-lane single carriageways with grade-separated intersections (D33 in Šibenik). They are either a standalone state road (D10) or a part of one (Southern Osijek bypass, D2). Some portions of motorways are expressways since they are either in construction (A8 between Pazin and Matulji) or designed as such (A7 in Rijeka). As a rule, the expressways are not tolled, however major tunnels on expressways are tolled.

==== Czech Republic: Silnice pro motorová vozidla ====

Highways for motorcars in the Czech Republic (Czech: Silnice pro motorová vozidla, are defined as grade-separated dual carriageways. The speed limit is 110 km/h (68 mph). Highway for motorcars road signs are white on blue.

==== Denmark: Motortrafikvej ====

In Denmark, a 'motortrafikvej' (Danish for "motor traffic road") is a high-speed highway normally with a speed limit of 80 km/h (50 mph). The most common 'motortrafikvej' has two lanes (1+1) or 2+1. The signs for 'motortrafikvej' have white text on blue background.

==== Finland: Moottoriliikennetie ====

In Finland, highways are separated into three categories: all-access valtatie ("main road"), limited-access moottoriliikennetie ("motor traffic road") and finally moottoritie ("motorway"); the latter two are marked with green signage, while valtatie signage is blue. While most of the network is all-access road, 779 km (484 mi) of it is motorway, and 124 km (77 mi) is limited-access road. The access is limited to motor vehicles faster than 50 km/h (31 mph), thus excluding pedestrian, bicycle, moped or tractor traffic; furthermore, towing is not allowed. Limited-access roads are generally similar to motorways, but do not fulfill all the technical requirements, such as several lanes in one direction or separation of opposite directions. Limited-access roads are usually built because the local population density is too low to justify a motorway. Often space has been left during construction for an eventual upgrade to a motorway. Limited-access roads also function as feeder routes for motorways. The general speed limit on main roads and limited-access roads is 100 km/h (62 mph) (summertime) and 80 km/h (50 mph) (wintertime). On motorways the speed limits are 120 and 100 km/h (75 and 62 mph) respectively. Especially during winter the speed limits can be changed due to weather conditions.

==== France: voies rapides and voies expresses ====

In France, limited-access roads are usually called voies rapides (fast roads) or voies expresses (express roads or expressways), which are usually dual carriageways built to a lower design standard than autoroutes. Most such roads are upgrades or bypasses of national roads (routes nationales) or departmental roads (routes départementales), or are ring roads around major cities (such as with Paris's Boulevard Périphérique) and access is usually through grade-separated interchanges and in some intersections and termini, roundabouts. Such roads usually have blue signs implying traffic restrictions similar to those of autoroutes and a maximum speed limit of 110 km/h (68 mph) that is lowered to 100 km/h (62 mph) during rainy weather.

==== Germany: Kraftfahrstraße ====
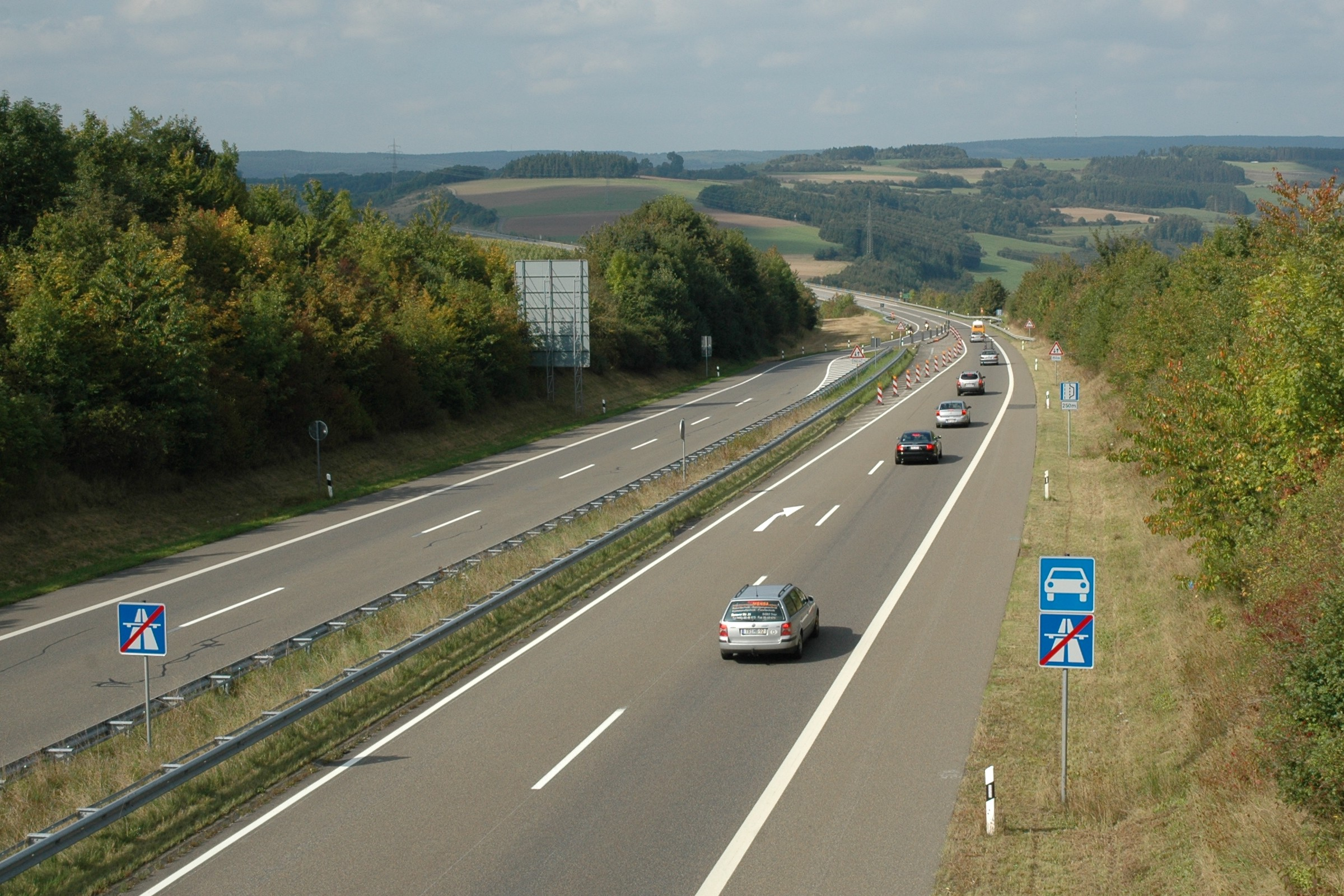
Kraftfahrstrasse passage of Bundesautobahn 60 near Prüm–Bleialf

A Kraftfahrstrasse (German for "motor-power road", also colloquially called Schnellstraße, literally "fast road") in Germany is any road with access limited to motor vehicles with a maximum design speed of more than 60 km/h (37 mph), excluding pedestrian, bicycle, moped or tractor traffic. Oversized vehicles are banned.

The construction of transregional Kraftfahrstraßen highways (Autostraßen) rank below the standard of German autobahns. With regard to the general German speed limits, on roads with lanes separated by a median or with a minimum of two marked lanes per direction, an advisory speed limit (Richtgeschwindigkeit) of 130 km/h (81 mph) applies. At-grade intersections are admissible, regulation at junctions is usually provided by traffic lights or roundabouts. U-turns and any deliberate stopping are prohibited. Kraftfahrstraßen are out of bounds to pedestrians, except for special crosswalks.

==== Hungary: Autóút ====

Expressways in Hungary are called Autóút (Auto/car road). They are mostly dual carriageways. The main difference between Hungarian motorways and expressways is, that they are more cheaply built with narrower width and often undivided. The maximum speed limit is reduced to 110 km/h (68 mph) for vehicles under 3.5 tons, and 70 km/h (43 mph) for vehicles over 3.5 tons.

In Hungary there are multiple types of dual carriageways. One part is almost identical with motorways, but the driving lanes are narrower.

Parameters of a 2+2 lane dual carriageway off-habitat area:

- Total width of road: 25.60 m
- Driving lane width: 3.50 m
- Pavement width: 2×10.25 m
- Parking lane: 3.00 m
- Middle separation area width: 3.60 m

Parameters of a 2+2 lane dual carriageway in habitat (town/city) area:

- Total width of road: 24.10 m
- Driving lane width: 3.50 m
- Pavement width: 2×10.75 m
- Parking lane: 3.00 m
- Middle separation area width: 3.60 m

There are also semi-motorways with only one side of the motorway built. After the missing lanes are built, they will become standard motorways.

==== Ireland: HQDC ====
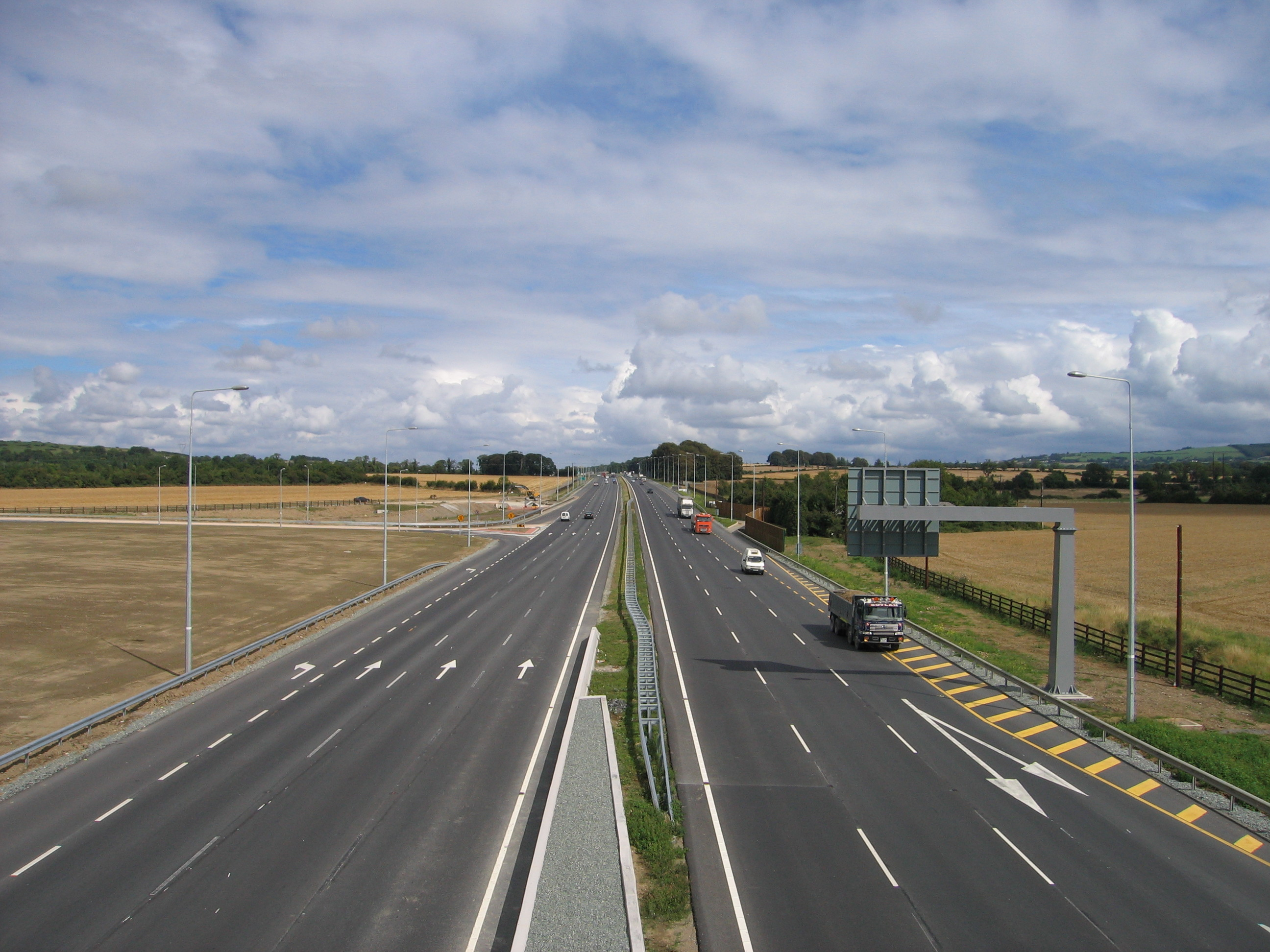
The 6 lane Naas Road, the final stretch of the M7 nearing Dublin.

A High-quality dual carriageway (HQDC) in Ireland is normally completed to a motorway standard, including no right-turns, but with no motorway restrictions. These are common on the final stretches of motorways nearing a major city, generally in order to enable use of bus stops and city bus services on the particular stretch of road.

Speed limits are normally 100 km/h (62 mph) compared to 120 km/h (75 mph) on motorways

==== Italy: Superstrada ====
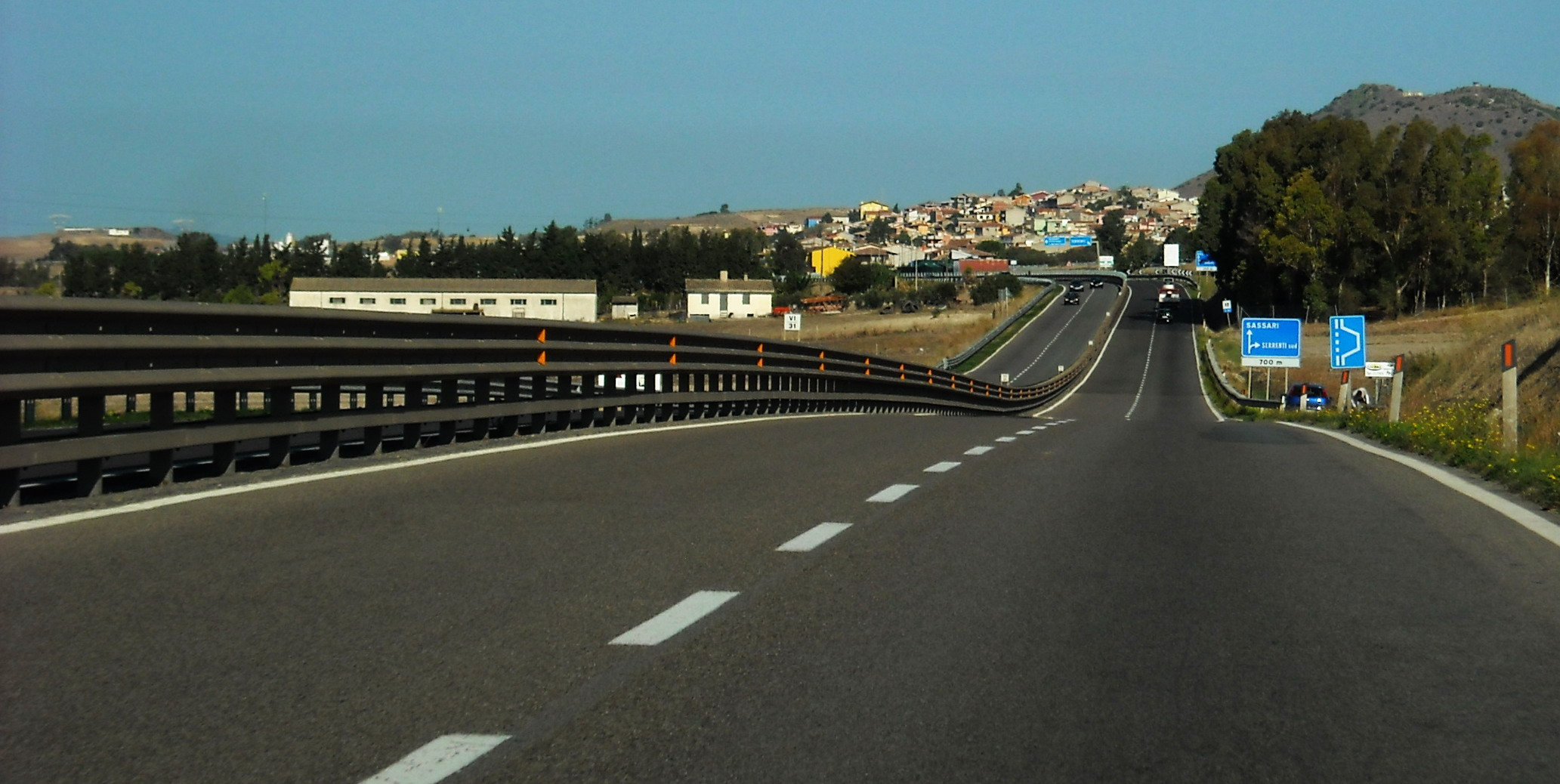
The superstrada Cagliari-Porto Torres (Strada statale 131 Carlo Felice), the main road artery of Sardinia

Strada extraurbana principale

In Italy there are: Type B highway (or strada extraurbana principale), commonly but unofficially known as superstrada, is a divided highway with at least two lanes for each direction, paved shoulder on the right, no cross-traffic and no at-grade intersections. Access restrictions on such highways are exactly the same of Italian motorways (autostrade), as well as signage at the beginning and the end of the highway (with the only difference being the background color, blue instead of green). Speed limit on type-B road is 110 km/h (68 mph).

Motorized vehicles only (this sign is not associated with any particular road type)

Type C highway (or strada extraurbana secondaria), a single carriageway with at least one lane for each direction and shoulders. It may have at-grade, at-level crossings with railways, roundabouts and traffic lights. This category contains also dual carriageways that can not be classified as type-B highways because of the lack of one or more required features. In absence of specific regulation signs, a type-C road is accessible by all vehicles and pedestrians, even if it has separate carriageways and no cross-traffic.

The sign shown here on the left allows access only to motorized vehicles. Speed limit on type-C roads is 90 km/h (56 mph).

==== Netherlands: Autoweg ====

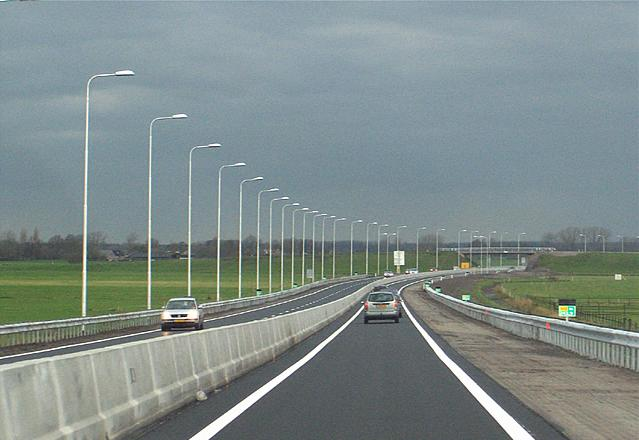
Single carriageway expressway that was economically upgraded to (mostly) meet the new Regional flow road standard. A physical traffic barrier, and a hard shoulder were added.

The Netherlands has much more kilometres of motorways (snelwegen), than expressways (autowegen). The latter only form a complementary part of the country's main highway network. They are typically shorter than motorways, offering connections of a more regional significance. The general speed limit is 100 km/h (62 mph). Only faster motor vehicles, both capable and legally allowed to go at least 50 km/h (31 mph), may use the road. Autowegen are always numbered and mostly signposted with an N (for Non motorway highway) and up to three digits, like N 34. For the most part they fall under national or provincial management.

Dutch expressways are built to significantly varying standards. Designs range from fully controlled-access dual carriageways with grade separation, center dividers and full hard shoulders, to single carriageways with just one lane per direction and only intermittent shoulder patches called Vluchthavens (small Lay-bys). Intersections are frequently at grade with traffic lights, or they are roundabouts. There can be moveable bridges in these roads. In either case, the speed limit is frequently reduced to 70 km/h (43 mph) before reaching the junction or the bridge.

Since 1997 a national traffic safety program called Sustainable Safety has introduced a new road categorisation and new design standards. Although autowegen don't have to conform completely to the new Dutch design standard for regional flow roads (stroomwegen), many of these roads require at least some upgrades. The ideal is to make expressways divided and grade-separated, as much as possible. Otherwise these roads are downgraded to the safety category of distributor roads, thereby losing their expressway status.

==== Norway: Motortrafikkvei ====
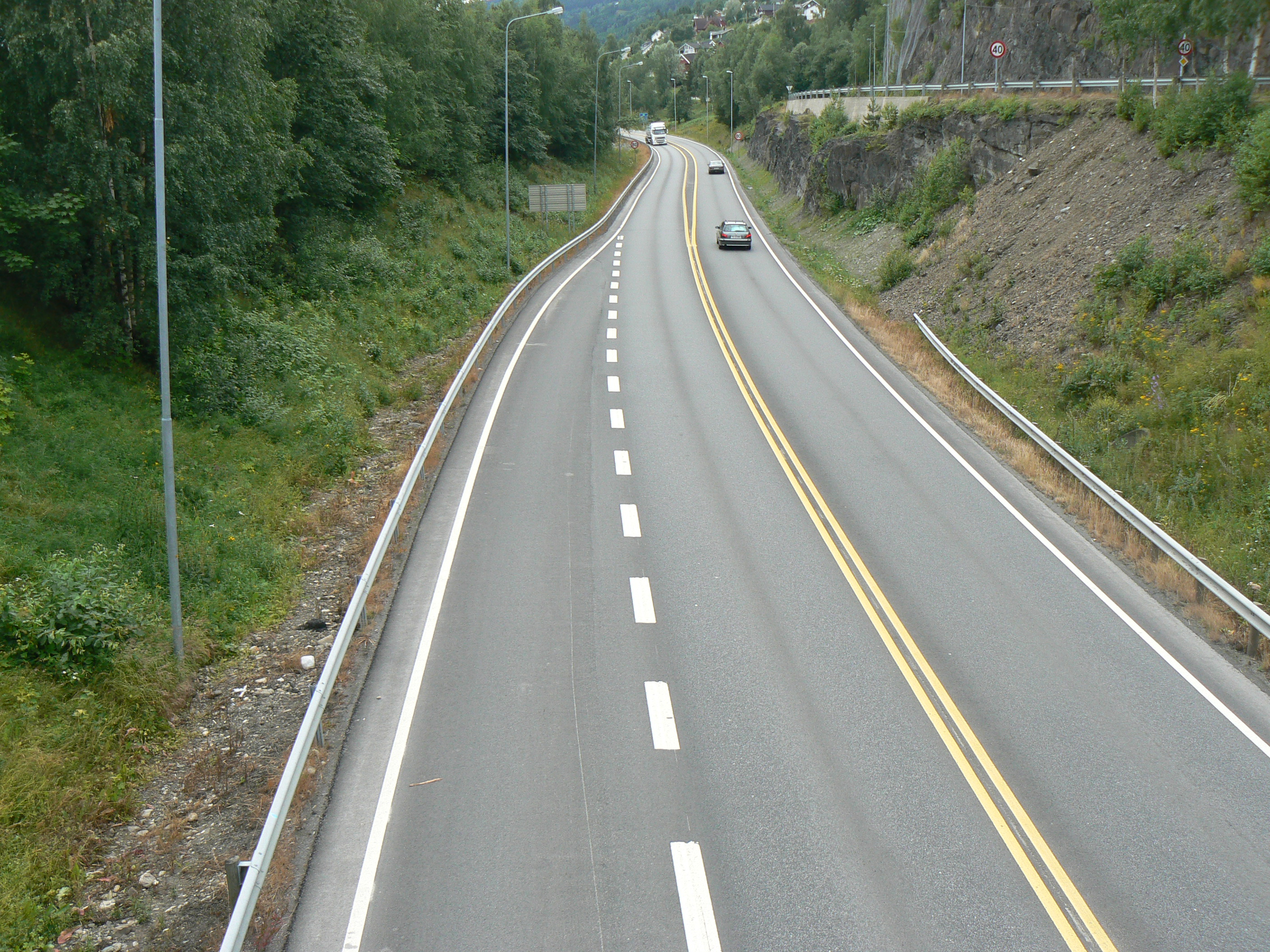
E6 motortrafikkvei at Lillehammer, Norway

In Norway, a motortrafikkvei (Norwegian for "motor traffic road"), formerly called motorvei klasse B ("class-B motorway") is a high-speed highway normally with a speed limit of 80 or 90 km/h (50 or 56 mph) respectively), and mainly with grade-separated intersections. Direction signs for motortrafikkvei have black text on yellow background, while same signs on motorvei have white text on blue background. As of October 2017 the Norwegian Road DataBase show approximately 455 km (283 mi) of motortrafikkvei in Norway.

==== Poland: droga ekspresowa ====
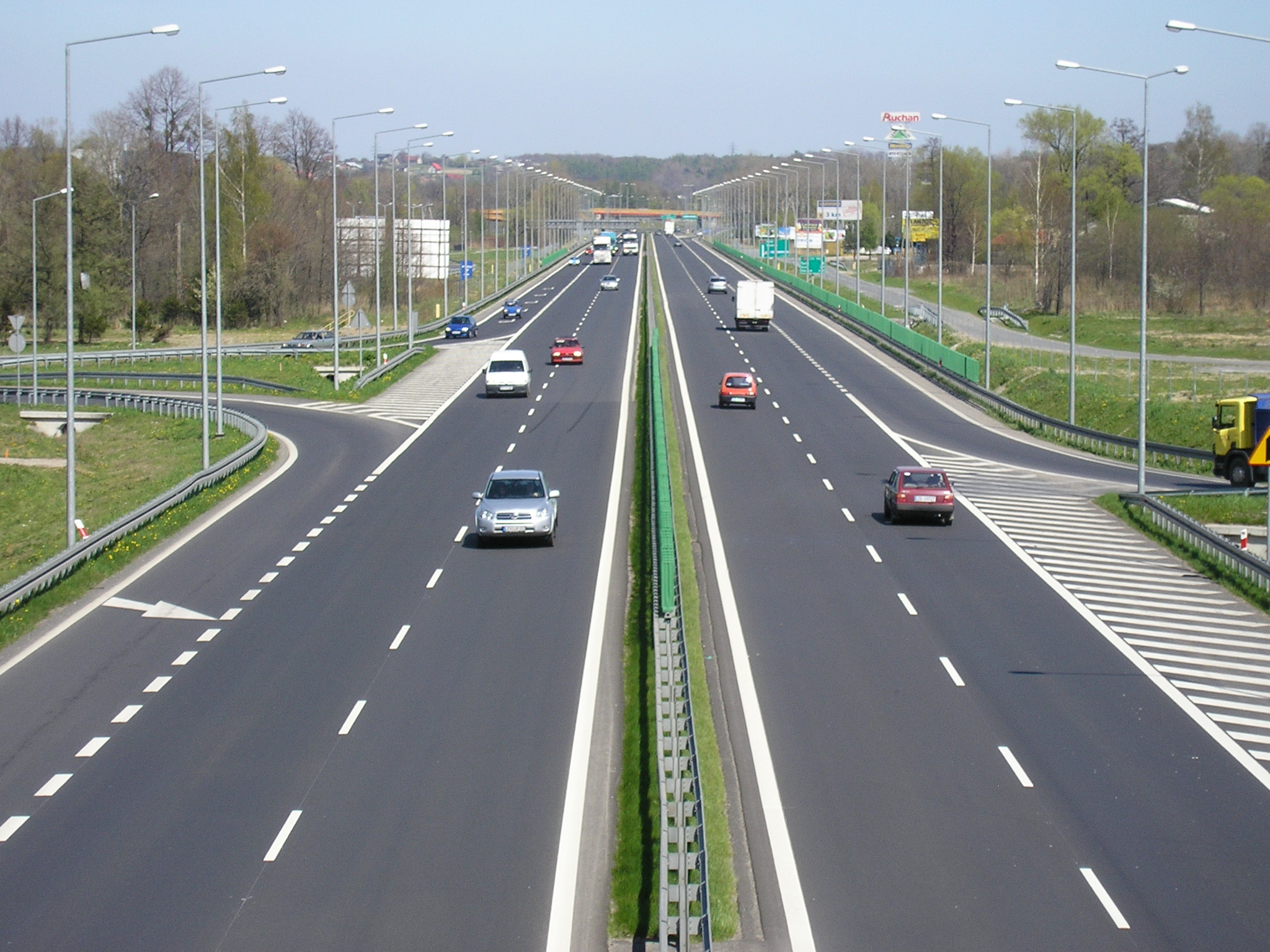
S1 Droga ekspresowa in Bielsko-Biała, Poland

Sign B-6/8/9: No entry for non-motor vehicles

Droga ekspresowa (plural: drogi ekspresowe) refers to a type of road in the Polish highway network, with slightly lower technical parameters than the autostrada (motorway), and serving major international and inter-regional purposes. They are often built as ring roads since they take less space than motorway and allow more entrances and exits. All expressways start with the letter S followed by a number, and are signposted with the D-7 traffic sign. They can be dual or single carriageways, but as of May 2024, only 178 km (111 mi) out of 3,102 km (1,927 mi) of Polish expressways are single-carriageway. Since 2020, all expressways as well as motorways have grade-separated intersections, which also, since 2022, is a requirement. The speed limit is 120 km/h (75 mph) on dual carriageway or 100 km/h (62 mph) on single carriageway.

As of May 2004 the Polish government documents indicated that the country had plans of an expressway and motorway network totalling 7,200 km (4,470 mi) (including about 2,000 km (1,240 mi) of motorways).

Those limited-access roads, which are not part of the Polish national highway network, are signposted with a separate B-6/8/9 prohibitory sign, which bans all traffic not allowed on highways.

==== Portugal: via rápida ====
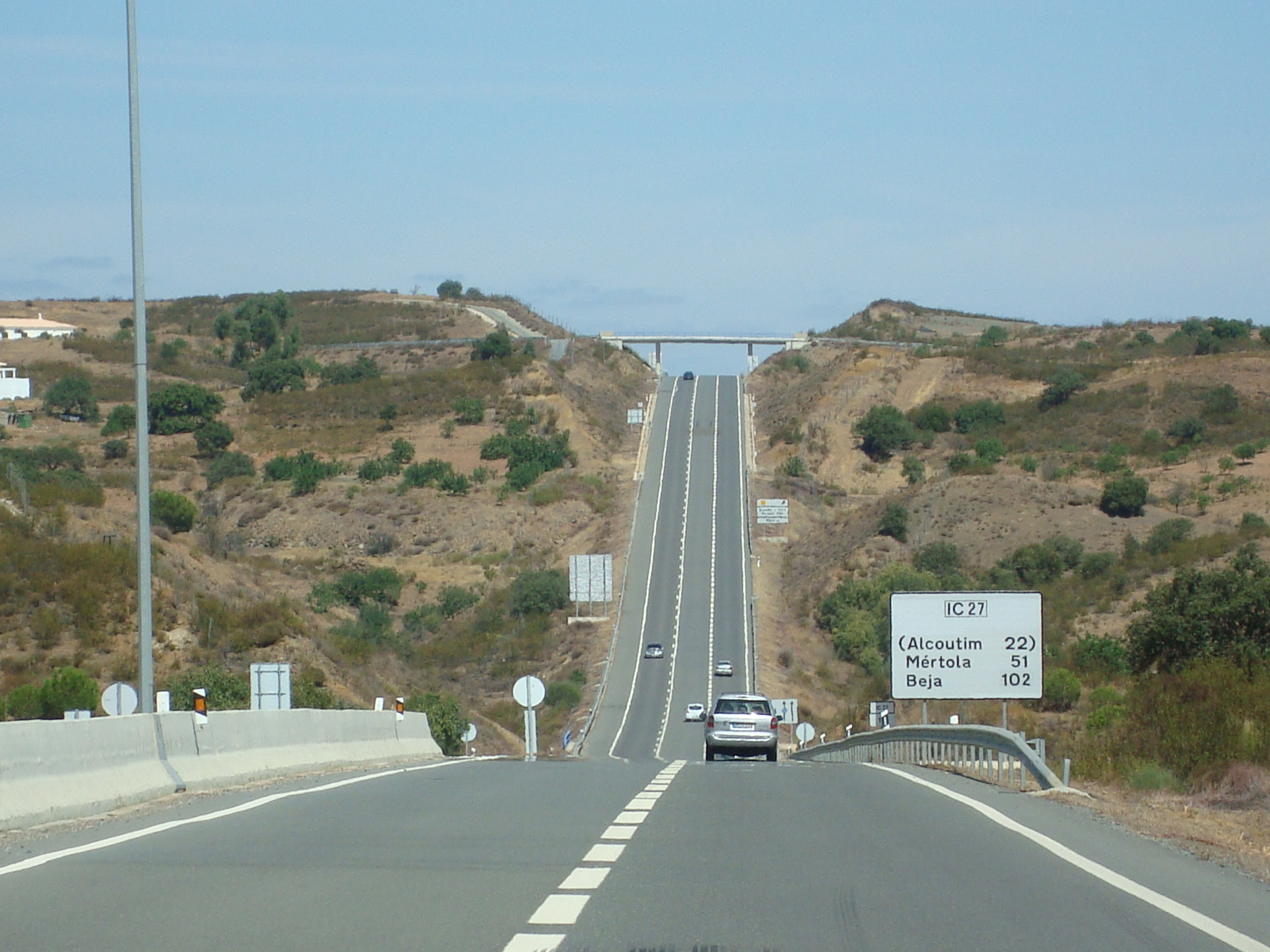
IC27 complementary route in Algarve, Portugal, a single carriageway type via rápida.

In Portugal, a non-motorway limited access road is commonly referred as a via rápida (rapid way, plural: vias rápidas), although there is not a specific official technical designation for it.

The legal term via reservada a automóveis e motociclos (reserved way for automobiles and motorcycles) is used to designate a non-motorway road where motorway rules apply (except the speed limit which is lower). However, this term refers only to the road rules and not to the road technical characteristics.

There are two main types of roads commonly referred as vias rápidas in Portugal. The first type is a limited access road, with dual carriageway and with interchanges grade separation. Many of these roads have all or almost all the technical characteristics of full motorways. Examples are the several urban highways in cities like Lisbon, Porto, Coimbra and Braga. In Madeira, the main regional highways, that connect the cities and other important places of the island, are mainly of these type, there are two vias rápidas classified as motorways in the region, VR1 and VR2.

The second Portuguese type of via rápida is a highway with all the same characteristics of the above first type, except the number of carriageways that is only one. Examples of this type of roads are the ancient IP4 and IP5 (before being transformed in full motorways), the Portalegre-Beja section of the IP2, the Coimbra-Viseu section of the IP3 and several complementary routes (IC).

The dual carriageway vias rápidas can be classified and signalized as reserved ways for automobiles and motorcycles, cases in which general motorway rules apply, except speed limited which is never above 100 km/h (62 mph). In dual carriageway vias rápidas not signalized as reserved ways, normal road rules apply, including speed limit which is never above 90 km/h (56 mph). Single carriageway vias rápidas cannot be classified and signalized as reserved ways and so normal road rules always apply there.

==== Romania ====

In Romania, such roads are called drumuri expres (or drum expres in singular form). Whilst there is only one expressway in Romania so far, their main difference from regular motorways are the lack of hard shoulders and a slightly lower speed limit of 120 km/h (75 mph), otherwise, being similar to a motorway regarding grade separation and featuring at least 2 lanes per direction.

Expressways were introduced for the first time on the 2014 roads masterplan. This masterplan envisaged building most planned motorways up to expressway standards, provided that in the future they would be converted to actual motorways. However, by mid-2019, no expressway has been built, nevermind starting works on one, although contracts were signed to allow for their construction, meaning that in the 2020s more expressways will likely be completed.

Planned expressways according to CNADNR (Romanian National Company of Motorways and National Roads), based on the 2014 roads masterplan:

Expressway	Name	Route	Length (km) / in use (km)	Remarks
DEx1	Valahia Express	Găești – Târgoviște – Ploiești	74 / 0	will connect A1 to A3
DEx2	Danubius Express	Lugoj – Drobeta-Turnu Severin – Craiova – Caracal – Alexandria – Bucharest	246 / 0	will connect A6 to A12, then to A0
DEx3	Brașovia Express	Brașov – Pitești	65 / 0	will connect A3 to A1
DEx4	Someș Express	Turda – Cluj-Napoca – Gherla – Dej – Baia Mare – Halmeu border-crossing to Ukraine	320 / 0	will connect A3 to Ukraine
DEx4A	Someș Express	Dej – Bistrița	56 / 0	will connect DEx4 to Bistrița
DEx4B	Someș Express	Ardusat (DX4 exit) – Baia Mare	10 / 0	will connect DEx4 to Baia Mare
DEx4C	Someș Express	Livada (DX4 exit) – Satu Mare – Petea border-crossing to Hungary	140 / 0	will connect DEx4 to Hungary
DEx5A	Moldavia Express	Bacău – Piatra Neamț	53 / 0	will connect A7 to Piatra Neamț
DEx6	Milcovia Express	Brăila – Focșani	108 / 0	will connect DEx5 to DEx7, then to DEx8, then to Republic of Moldova
DEx7	Muntenia Express	Buzău – Brăila	98 / 0	will connect DEx5 to DEx6
DEx8	Dobrogea Express	Constanța – Tulcea – Brăila	186 / 0	will connect A4 to DEx6
DEx12	Oltenia Express	Craiova – Slatina – Pitești	121 / 121	will connect A1 to DEx2

==== Russia ====
RU road sign 5.3

Russia has a large federal highway network that totals approximately 30,000 km (18,640 mi). Federal highways in the country are classified into two categories: "motorways" (Russian: магистральная автомобильная дорога, автомагистраль, not the same as the English term motorway) and "other". In the Road Rules, there are 2 designations for a limited-access road, one being "motorway" and the other being "road for cars"(Russian: дорога для автомобилей), on both of which special motorway rules apply. "Roads for cars" are different from motorways by the fact that they don't have to be dual-carriageway, at-grade traffic light intersections are permitted, and the speed limit is still 90 km/h (56 mph).

==== Spain: Vía rápida ====
{{https://es.wikipedia.org/wiki/V%C3%ADa_r%C3%A1pida}}

In Spain, expressways are roads with completely restricted access to adjacent properties and, like dual carriageways, without at-grade crossings or intersections with other paths, roads, railway lines, tram lines, etc., that have a right-of-way. They are generally single-carriageway roads with one lane in each direction. Expressway signage has a green background, and the nomenclature is that of the original road.

The "expressway" is simply a conventional road with improved traffic flow due to its better design, wider lanes and shoulders (between 1.5 and 2.5 meters wide), full access control, and the absence of at-grade intersections. This improved traffic flow, and therefore greater capacity, makes it a cost-effective alternative to dual carriageways when significant traffic increases are not anticipated. Otherwise, a dual carriageway is planned directly.

==== Slovakia: cesta pre motorove vozidla ====

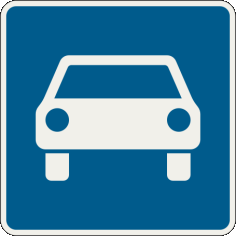
new sign fo road for motor vechicles

A cesta pre motorove vozidla (road for motorcars) in Slovakia, is different from a diaľnica, with speed limits ranging from 90 km/h (56 mph) to 130 km/h (81 mph). Rýchlostné cesty ("cesty" is the plural form of "cesta") was the term that was used, however, new road rules introduced in 2020 established that all expressways noted by the letter 'R' were to be considered motorways. A cesta pre motorove vozidla has two lanes on each side and, occasionally, may take the form of a single carriageway. Motorways/expressways which are single carriageways are also known as 'road for motor vehicles'.

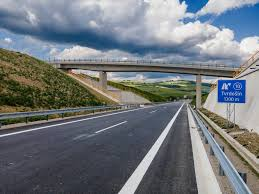
R3 in orava (Tvrdošín)

Rýchlostna cesta:

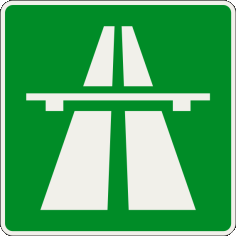

Although they are now considered to be as a type of motorway instead of being a sperate catergory (as they use the same sign as a motorway and have the same restrictions), in technical and construction terms they still share the same parameters of a expressway as before (that being that lanes are narrower, curves are tighter and exits are more frequent). They are designated by the letter 'R' and form the secondary routes of the Slovak motorway system. in total there are around 357 km of expressways in use with only (as of september 2026) 7.4 km under construction.

Old sign for expressways

R2 expressway in Slovakia

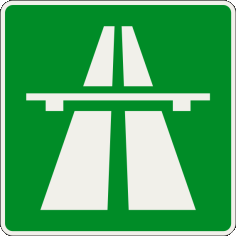
New sign for both Motorways and expressways as they are grouped under a unified category of motorways

==== Sweden ====

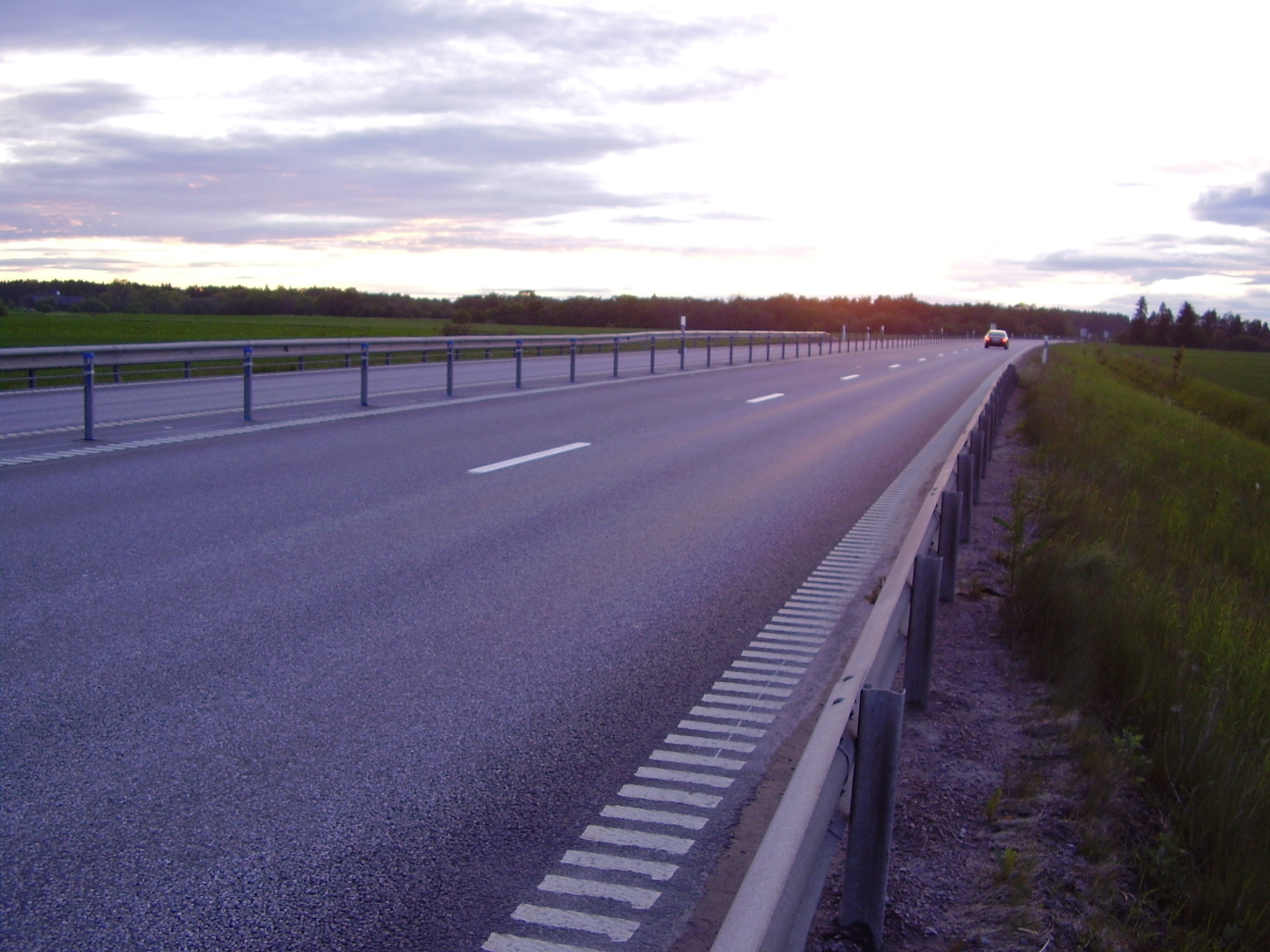
A Swedish 2+1 lane motortrafikled is part of Riksväg (national road) 34

The Swedish road type motortrafikled is a road with limited access (all grade-separated, no slow traffic) and two or three lanes. According to the EU's multilingual term base, motortrafikled should be translated to expressway, rapid road or road with limited access. The same rules apply to a motortrafikled as to a motorway - it is basically a half motorway. The speed limit is usually 90–100 km/h (56–62 mph). Many motortrafikleder are built as 2+1 roads, alternating two lanes in one direction and one in the other, with a narrow fence in between.

==== Switzerland ====

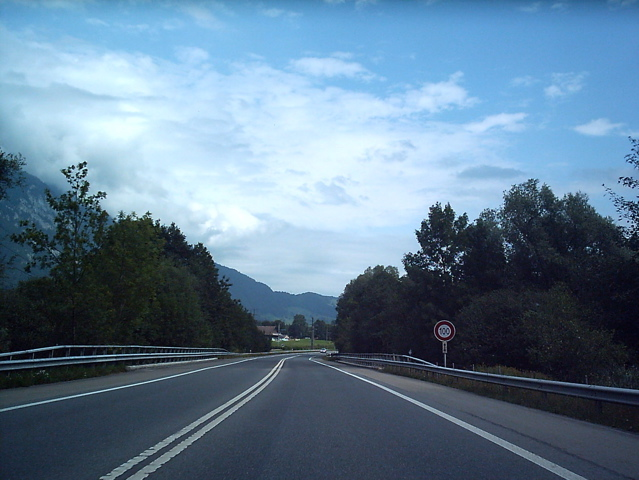
The A8 Autostrasse in Switzerland. Notice the speed limit, which is repetitively indicated, and the lack of a central physical barrier

In Switzerland Autostrasse (German, auto road), semi-autoroute, or semiautostrada (French and Italian for semi-freeway) is a highway that is only allowed to high-speed traffic with no crossings, but it is not the highest class road, the motorways (Autobahn/autoroute/autostrada). The speed limit on these roads in Switzerland is 100 km/h (62 mph). Most of the Autostrasse / semi-autoroutes / semiautostrade have no central barrier separating the lanes in different directions.

==== Turkey ====

Sign B-20 indicates the start of a road that may be accessed only by motorized vehicles (motorlu taşıt yolu). However, there is currently no roads marked with the sign. It is stated that the rules applicable on such roads are the same as on an Otoyol.

It is common to see dual carriageways (often called bölünmüş yol) with at-grade junctions and a speed limit of 110 km/h (outside built-up areas [meskun mahal] where the speed limit is 50 km/h).

==== United Kingdom ====

In the United Kingdom, the second tier of high speed roads below motorways are typically dual carriageways (although the term "dual carriageway" can refer to roads that are not limited-access, so long as traffic in opposite directions is physically separated). Many roads such as the A1, the A14, the A19 and the A42 are built to a high quality, in many places they are only intersected by grade-separated junctions, have full barriers at both the road side and the central reservations and in some cases three or more lanes of traffic, however they are not subjected to motorway restrictions as they are typically built to a lower standard, or have existing rights of way for non motorised vehicles. They may lack some features that a motorway would have, such as hard shoulders, and may have tighter bends and steeper gradients than would be allowed on a motorway or have established rights of way that cannot be removed. The standard motorway speed limit for cars of 70 mph (110 km/h) also applies to many dual carriageways.

In March 2015, it was announced that a new standard would be developed to formally designate certain high-quality routes in England as Expressways. This new standard would have the same motorway regulations as traditional motorways, however would lack a hard shoulder and use traffic management systems like those on smart motorways. An "expressway" is limited to 3 through lanes, they are to be built largely to the same standards as a smart motorway, although some non-standard existing alignments are allowed to remain if they are just short of being standard.

Some roads have "expressway" in their name, this has no reflection on the purpose or standard of the road. For example, the Aston Expressway or the North Wales Expressway.

=== North America ===
==== Canada ====
In Ontario, expressway is synonymous with freeway and is used to mean limited-access divided-highways with no at-grade intersections. An example of this is the Gardiner Expressway through western and downtown Toronto, and once it turns into a 6-lane arterial road (Lake Shore Boulevard) east of the Don River, there is a sign warning of the end of the freeway. The E. C. Row Expressway in Windsor, Ontario is a controlled-access divided freeway with grade-separated interchanges, between Ojibway Parkway at its western terminus and Banwell Road at its eastern terminus, where there are traffic intersections at both termini. The Macdonald–Cartier Freeway would be an example of a route that uses the term freeway, however, that name is being phased out by the Ministry of Transportation. In general, the term "expressway" is used more frequently for municipally maintained roads, while provincial freeways are known more by their route number (particularly the 400-series highways are known as Highway 4__) despite some of them having an "expressway" name for all or part of their length, such as the (Chedoke Expressway/Hamilton Expressway, Belfield Expressway, and Airport Expressway).

The Veterans Memorial Parkway in London, Ontario, has intersections instead of interchanges, and thus is considered an expressway and not a freeway. It was originally designed with sufficient right-of-way to be built as a full freeway, but a lack of funding forced it to be built with at-grade intersections. Similarly, the Hanlon Parkway in Guelph and Highway 40 in Sarnia, Ontario were originally opened with intersections in lieu of interchanges, save for the couple grade-separated interchanges. Regional Road 420 in Niagara Falls is also an expressway. While Allen Road and Highway 400 were originally full freeways, their extensions (for Allen Road to meet Sheppard Avenue and Dufferine Street, and the 400 South Extension which became Black Creek Drive and handed over to Metro Toronto upon completion) were built as expressways with at-grade intersections.

Two sections of Highway 11, between Barrie and Orillia as well as between Orillia and Gravenhurst, are a right-in Right-out (RIRO) expressway rather than a full freeway. The joint route of Highway 35/115 in Durham Region is also a RIRO expressway.

In most of Western Canada, an expressway is a high-speed arterial road along the lines of the California definition, while a freeway is fully controlled access with no at-grade intersections. In Alberta, the term "Trail" refers to both full freeways (e.g. Stoney Trail), or high-speed arterials with a mix of signalized intersections and interchanges (e.g. Crowchild Trail). The Yellowhead Trail as it passes through Edmonton, Alberta has both intersections and interchanges. It is the main east–west artery for the northern half of the city. There are plans to upgrade many of the most congested remaining intersections into interchanges in the near future.

In Quebec, the term freeway is never used, with the terms expressway (in English) and autoroute (in English and French) being preferred. English terms are rare, and only found on bilingual signage of expressways (abbreviated "expy") found in Montreal around bridges and on the Bonaventure Expressway; these signs are controlled by the federal government. Most of the Autoroutes are built or at least designed to be upgraded to a full freeway (initially constructed as a two-lane expressway), a notable exception is the section of Autoroute 20 through Vaudreuil-Dorion and L'Île-Perrot which is an 8 km (5.0 mi) urban boulevard.

==== United States ====
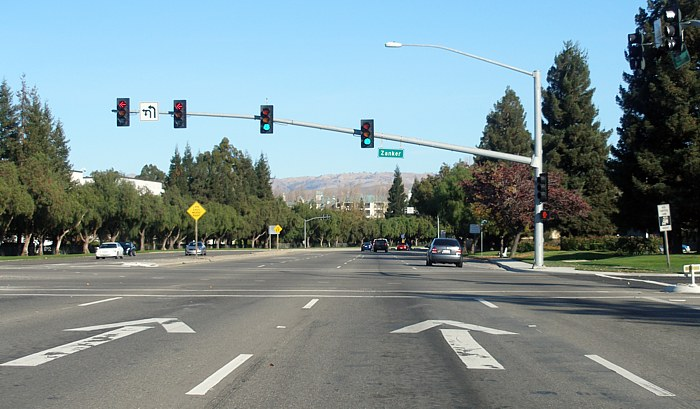
County Route G4 (Montague Expressway), an American expressway under the MUTCD definition

In the United States, an expressway is defined by the federal government's Manual on Uniform Traffic Control Devices as a divided highway with partial control of access. In contrast, a freeway is defined as a divided highway with full control of access. The difference between partial and full access control is that expressways may have a limited number of driveways and at-grade intersections (thus making them a form of high-speed arterial road), while access to freeways is allowed only at grade-separated interchanges. Expressways under this definition do not conform to Interstate highway standards (which ban all driveways and at-grade intersections) and are therefore usually numbered as state highways or U.S. Highways.

This distinction was first developed in 1949 by the Special Committee on Nomenclature of what is now the American Association of State Highway and Transportation Officials (AASHTO). In turn, the definitions were incorporated into AASHTO's official standards book, the Manual on Uniform Traffic Control Devices, which would become the national standards book of the U.S. Department of Transportation under a 1966 federal statute. The same distinction has also been codified into the statutory law of eight states: California, Minnesota, Mississippi, Missouri, Nebraska, North Dakota, Ohio, and Wisconsin.

However, each state codified the federal distinction slightly differently. California expressways do not necessarily have to be divided, though they must have at least partial access control. For both terms to apply in Wisconsin, a divided highway must be at least four lanes wide. In Missouri, both terms apply only to divided highways at least 10 miles long that are not part of the Interstate Highway System. In North Dakota and Mississippi, an expressway may have "full or partial" access control and "generally" has grade separations at intersections; a freeway is then defined as an expressway with full access control. Ohio's statute is similar, but instead of the vague word "generally", it imposes a requirement that 50% of an expressway's intersections must be grade-separated for the term to apply. Only Minnesota enacted the exact MUTCD definitions, in May 2008.

However, many states around the Great Lakes region and along the Eastern Seaboard have not conformed their terminology to the federal definition. The following states officially prefer the term expressway instead of freeway to describe what are freeways in federal parlance: Connecticut, Florida, Illinois, Maryland, and West Virginia. In those states, it is common to find Interstate highways that bear the name expressway. Ultimately, by law it is the federal definition that defines whether a road is classified as an expressway or freeway. No state, for instance, could have what is technically an expressway given Interstate status just because semantically they use the term interchangeably with freeway.

Most expressways under the federal definition have speed limits of 45–55 mph (72–89 km/h) in urban areas and 55–70 mph (89–113 km/h) in rural areas. Urban expressways are usually free of private driveways, but occasional exceptions include direct driveways to gas stations and shopping malls at major intersections (which would never be allowed on a true freeway).

The vast majority of expressways are built by state governments, or by private companies, which then operate them as toll roads pursuant to a license from the state government.

A famous example of a local government getting into the expressway business is Santa Clara County in California, which deliberately built its own expressway system in the 1960s to supplement the freeway system then planned by Caltrans. Although the county originally planned to upgrade the expressways into full-fledged freeways, such a project became politically infeasible after the rise of the tax revolt movement in the mid-1970s, which began with California Proposition 13 in 1978.

=== South America ===
==== Brazil ====
In Brazil, an expressway is known as Via Expressa and its function is to connect the most important streets and avenues of certain cities with their adjacent highways. Because of this, some expressways are numbered (in the same way as highways). According to the Código Brasileiro de Trânsito (Brazilian Traffic Code), expressways are officially defined as Vias de Trânsito Rápido (Rapid Transit Routes) and are considered the most important urban roads, with standard speed limits of 80 km/h (50 mph) (unless specified). A few examples of expressways include Marginal Tietê and Marginal Pinheiros in São Paulo; Avenida Brasil, Red Line and Yellow Line in Rio de Janeiro; among others.

== See also ==
- Supercorridor
