= List of power stations in Singapore =

Location of power stations in Singapore: oil, gas, waste

The majority of electricity in Singapore comes from natural gas power plants.

== List by fuel ==
=== Oil-fired thermal ===
Name	Location	Capacity (MW)	Commissioned	Owner	Type	Refs
Senoko Power Station		500	1983	Senoko Energy Pte Ltd	Oil	
Tuas Power Station		600	1999	Tuas Power Ltd	Oil	
Pulau Seraya Power Station		1500	1987-1992	YTL PowerSeraya Pte Ltd	Oil	

=== Gas ===
Name	Location	Capacity (MW)	Commissioned	Owner	Type	Refs
PacificLight Plant	47, Jurong Highway, Seraya Rise, Singapore, 627626	815	2013	PacificLight Power Pte Ltd	LNG	
SembCorp Cogen @ Banyan	2 Banyan Road, Singapore, 627644	400	2014	SembCorp Cogen Pte Ltd	NG, cogen	
Pulau Sakra Power Station	71 Sakra Avenue, Singapore, 627876	815	2001	SembCorp Cogen Pte Ltd	NG, cogen	
Senoko Power Station	31 Senoko Rd, Singapore 758103	2800	1996-2012	Senoko Energy Pte Ltd	NG	
Tuas Power Plant	60 Tuas South Ave 9, Singapore 637607	1875.9	2001-2014	Tuas Power Generation Pte Ltd	NG	
Jurong Power Station	16 Jurong Pier Rd, Singapore 619175	210	1986	YTL PowerSeraya Pte Ltd	NG	
Pulau Seraya Power Station	3 Seraya Ave, Singapore 628209	1540	2002-2010	YTL PowerSeraya Pte Ltd	NG	
Keppel Merlimau Cogen Power Station	201 Jurong Island Hwy, Singapore 627805	1340	2007-2013	Keppel Merlimau Cogen Pte Ltd	NG, cogen	
Total	Singapore	9,780.9			NG	

=== Waste to energy ===
Name	Location	Capacity (MW)	Commissioned	Owner	Type	Refs
Keppel Seghers Tuas Waste-to-Energy Plant		22	2009	Keppel Seghers Tuas Waste-to-Energy Plant Pte Ltd	Waste-to-energy	
Senoko Incineration Plant		55	1993	Keppel Infrastructure Trust	Waste-to-energy	
Tuas Incineration Plant		47.8	1987	National Environment Agency	Waste-to-energy	
Tuas South Incineration Plant		132	2000	National Environment Agency	Waste-to-energy	

=== Solar ===
Singapore's installed solar capacity is 820 MW as of the end of 2022.

Name	Location	Capacity (MW)	Commissioned	Owner	Type	Refs
Tengeh Reservoir floating solar		60	2021	Sembcorp	Floating solar	
EDP Renewables APAC floating solar	Johor Strait, Woodlands	5	2021		Floating solar	
Bedok Reservoir floating solar		1.5	2019	Public Utilities Board	Floating solar	
Lower Seletar Reservoir floating solar		1.5	2019	Public Utilities Board	Floating solar	

== See also ==
- Energy in Singapore
- Electricity sector in Singapore
- List of largest power stations in the world
