= Porumbești =

Porumbeşti may refer to:

- Porumbeşti, a commune in Cantemir district, Moldova
- Porumbeşti, a commune in Satu Mare County, Romania

== See also ==
- Porumbeni (disambiguation)
