= Porumbeni =

Porumbeni or Porumbenii may refer to:

- Porumbeni, Harghita, a commune in Harghita County, Romania, sometimes called Porumbenii
- Porumbenii, a village in Silivașu de Câmpie Commune, Bistriţa-Năsăud County, Romania
- Porumbeni, a village in Ceuașu de Câmpie Commune, Mureș County, Romania
- Porumbeni, a village in Paşcani Commune, Criuleni district, Moldova

== See also ==
- Porumbești (disambiguation)
- Porumbrei, a commune in Cimişlia district, Moldova
