= Porumbești, Satu Mare =

Porumbești Kökényesd
- Commune
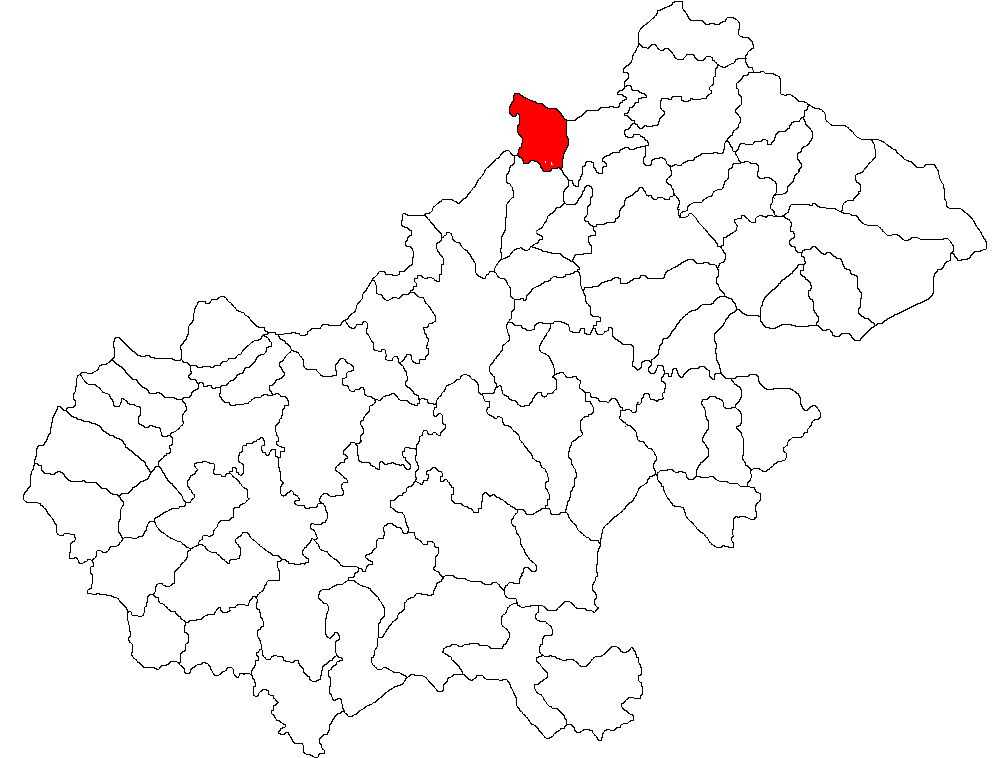
- Location in Satu Mare County

- Location in Romania
- Coordinates: 47°59′N 22°59′E
- Country: Romania
- County: Satu Mare

Government
  - Mayor: Zoltán Tóth (UDMR)
- Area: 33.40 km^{2} (12.90 sq mi)
- Elevation: 122 m (400 ft)
- Population (2021-12-01): 2,362
  - Density: 71/km^{2} (180/sq mi)
- Time zone: EET/EEST (UTC+2/+3)
- Postal code: 447152
- Vehicle reg.: SM
- Website: primariaporumbesti.ro

Porumbești (Hungarian: Kökényesd, Hungarian pronunciation: [ˈkøkeːɲɛʃd], meaning "Full of Blackthorns"; Rusyn: Кикиньишд) is a commune situated in Satu Mare County, Romania. It is composed of two villages, Cidreag (Hungarian: Csedreg; Rusyn: Чедреґ) and Porumbești. These were part of Halmeu Commune until 2005, when they were split off. At the 2011 census, 81.4% of inhabitants were Hungarians, 16.8% Roma and 1.6% Romanians.

The commune is located in the northwestern part of the county, on the border with Ukraine and near the border with Hungary, 37.8 km (23.5 mi) north of the country seat, Satu Mare. Its neighbors are Halmeu commune to the east, Turulung commune to the southeast, Micula commune to the southwest, and, on the Ukrainian side, Paladu Mare commune to the west and Nevetlenfalău commune to the north.
