= Halmeu =

Halmeu Halmi
- Commune
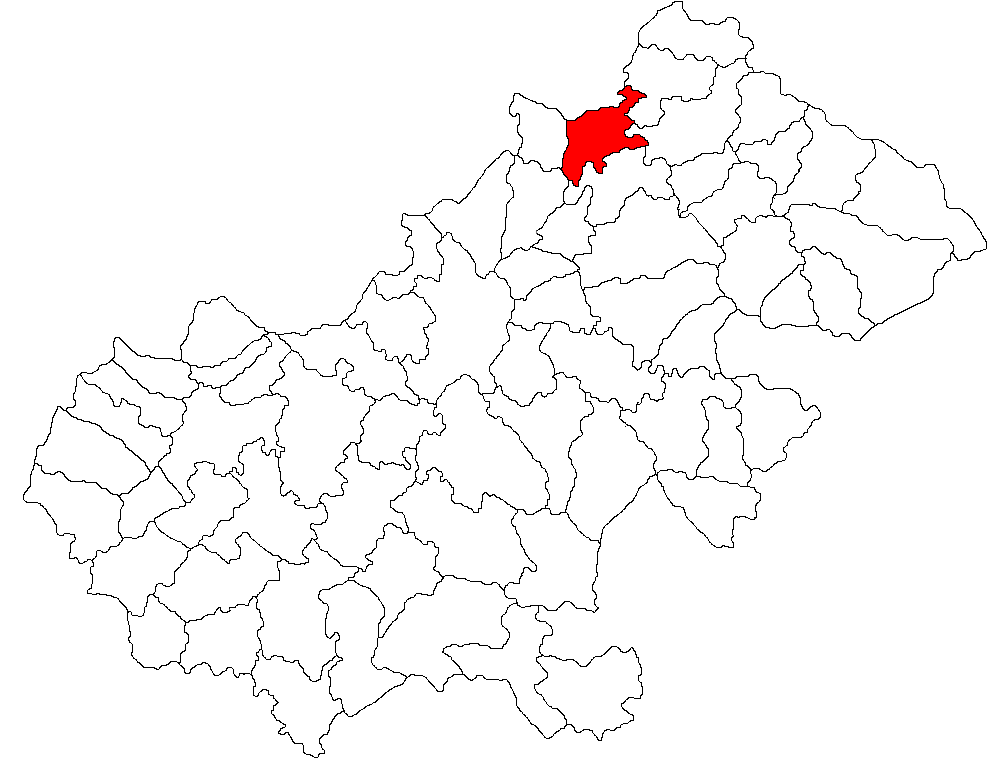
- Location in Satu Mare County

- Location in Romania
- Coordinates: 47°58′N 23°1′E
- Country: Romania
- County: Satu Mare

Government
  - Mayor (2020–2024): Ludovic Incze (UDMR)
- Area: 45.12 km^{2} (17.42 sq mi)
- Elevation: 125 m (410 ft)
- Population (2021-12-01): 4,276
  - Density: 95/km^{2} (250/sq mi)
- Time zone: EET/EEST (UTC+2/+3)
- Postal code: 447145
- Area code: +40 x59
- Vehicle reg.: SM
- Website: www.halmeu.ro

Halmeu (Hungarian: Halmi, pronounced [ˈhɒlmi]; Yiddish: האַַלמין) is a commune of 4,276 inhabitants situated in Satu Mare County, Romania. It is composed of five villages: Băbești (Kisbábony), Dobolț (Dabolc), Halmeu, Halmeu-Vii (Halmihegy), and Mesteacăn (Nyírestanya). The commune included two other villages until 2005, when they were split off to form Porumbești Commune.

== Geography ==
The commune is located in the northern part of the county, at a distance of 34 km (21 mi) from the county seat, Satu Mare, on the border with Ukraine and near the border with Hungary. It is traversed by national road DN1C (part of European route E58), which runs from Cluj-Napoca north towards Baia Mare and the border crossing at Halmeu, where it connects with the Ukrainian highway M26.

== Demographics ==
Until World War II, the village was home to a Jewish community, which numbered 479 people in 1877. In 1910, 97.6% reported Hungarian as their primary language. The religious make-up was 1,196 Calvinists (34.6%), 1061 Jews (30.7%), and 613 Roman Catholic (17.7%).

At the 2011 census, Halmeu had a population of 4,968, of which 57% were Romanians, 36% Hungarians, and 3% Roma; 57% had Romanian as first language, and 39% Hungarian.

At the 2021 census, the number of inhabitants had decreased to 4,276, of which 52.6% were Romanians, 36.23% Hungarians, and 1.61% Roma.
