= Manja (magazine) =

Singaporean magazine

- Singer Taufik Batisah on Manja, January 2010
- Editor: Ruslina Affandi
- Categories: Lifestyle, Entertainment
- Frequency: Monthly
- First issue: 30 January 2000
- Final issue: December 2016
- Company: Mediacorp
- Country: Singapore
- Language: Malay
- Website: Manja
- ISSN: 0219-483X

Manja ("pampered" in English), was a Malay-language entertainment and lifestyle magazine published monthly in Singapore by Mediacorp. It was launched in conjunction with Mediacorp's Malay channel, Mediacorp Suria on 30 January 2000. The last edition of magazine was published in December 2016 preparation for the transition to TV programming.

In 2005, Manja received the ASIA Media Awards for Best in Design (Gold Award).
