= PacificLight =

Singaporean energy company

PacificLight Power Plant
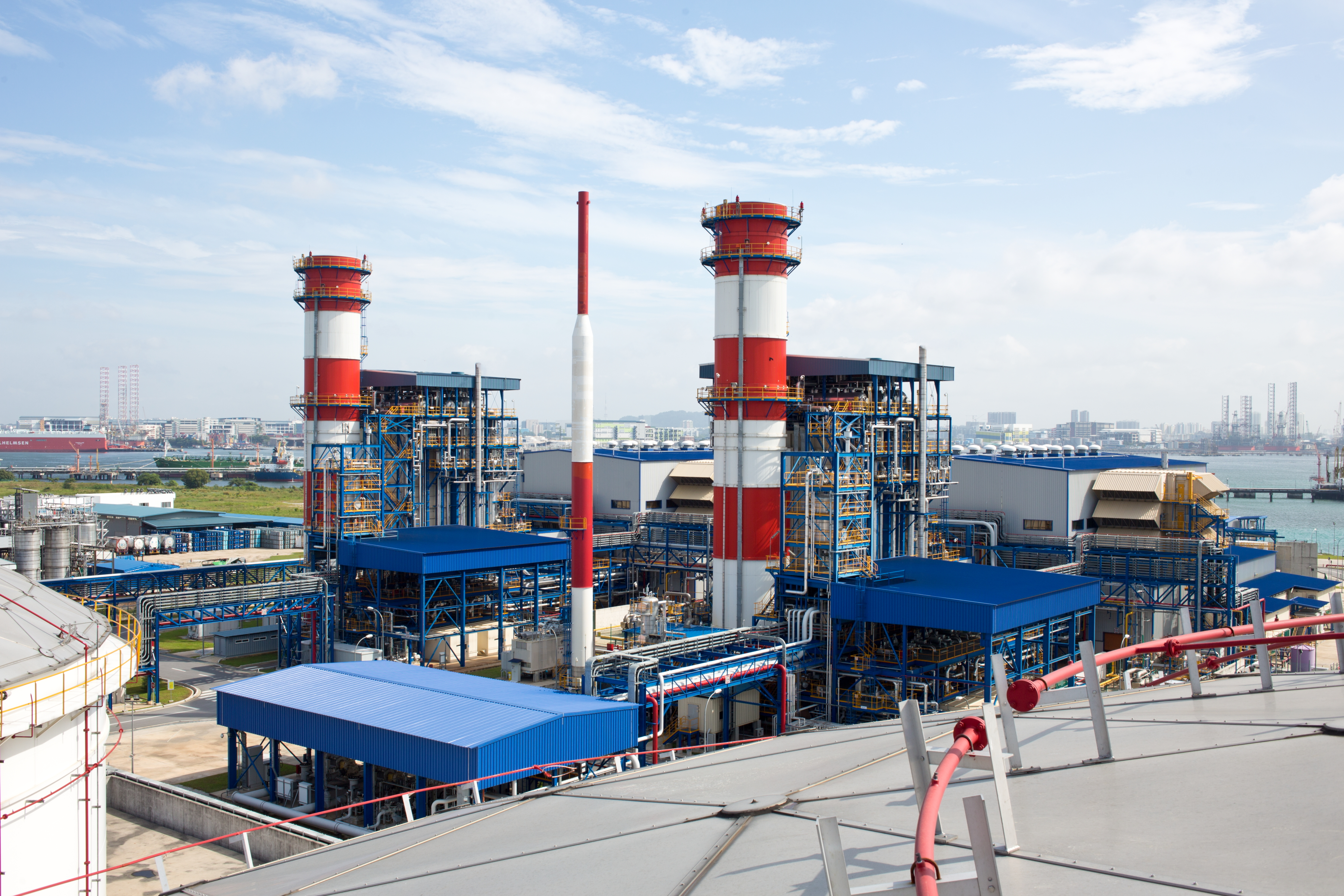
- PacificLight's 815MW power generation facility on Jurong Island, Singapore.
- Official name: PacificLight Power Pte Ltd PacificLight Energy Pte Ltd PacificLight Renewables Pte Ltd
- Country: Singapore
- Location: Jurong Island
- Coordinates: 1°17′01″N 103°43′21″E
- Status: Operational
- Commission date: 2013
- Construction cost: SGD 1.2 billion
- Owners: First Pacific Group; Meralco Powergen Corporation

Thermal power station
- Primary fuel: Natural gas
- Secondary fuel: Diesel
- Combined cycle?: Yes

Power generation
- Units operational: 2
- Make and model: Siemens SGT5-4000F Gas Turbine
- Nameplate capacity: 830MW (authorised)

External links
- Website: www.pacificlight.com.sg

PacificLight is a Singapore-based power generator and electricity retailer. It operates an 830 MW plant, operated by PacificLight Power Pte Ltd, which uses Liquefied Natural Gas (LNG) as its primary fuel. In 2023, PacificLight generated nearly 10% of Singapore’s total electricity demand.

PacificLight Energy Pte Ltd is a licensed electricity retailer in the National Energy Market of Singapore (NEMS) and sells electricity to businesses and residential customers in Singapore.

== History ==
The S$1.2 billion PacificLight Power Generation Facility is located on Jurong Island, an established industrial area in the south-west area of Singapore. The plant has been operating since 2013.

The 830 MW power generation facility consists of two units, each comprising a Siemens SGT5-4000F combustion turbine and a Siemens steam turbine mounted on a single shaft., which operates in a combined cycle arrangement. The Combined Cycle Gas Turbine (CCGT) power plant is one of the most efficient power plants currently operating in Singapore and the first to be completely fueled by Liquefied Natural Gas (LNG).

PacificLight’s power generation facility is registered as a Clean Development Mechanism (CDM) under the United Nations Framework Convention on Climate Change (UNFCCC), making it the largest CDM project in Singapore. The facility is the only fossil fuel-based power project of the five Singapore registered CDM projects. The project is also registered under the Verified Carbon Standard (VCS).

PacificLight has undertaken the region’s first Advanced Turbine Efficiency Package (ATEP), following an agreement signed with Siemens Energy in March 2021. The ATEP upgrade was completed in 2024, raising the plant’s total output to 830 MW. The ATEP upgrade has resulted in an annual carbon emission reduction of over 60,000 tonnes, equivalent to taking over 9,300 cars off the road every year.

Pacific Medco Solar Energy Pte Ltd, a consortium of PacificLight Renewables Pte Ltd, Medco Power Global and Gallant Venture, is developing a 600 MW solar import project to supply renewable electricity from Bulan Island in Indonesia to Singapore via a 230 kV HVAC subsea connection. In September 2023, the project was granted a Conditional Approval by Singapore’s Energy Market Authority and the first phase is expected to be completed in 2028.

PacificLight was awarded the right in 2025 to build, own and operate a hydrogen-ready Combined Cycle Gas Turbine (CCGT) facility on Jurong Island by the Energy Market Authority (EMA). Scheduled to commence operations in January 2029, this will be the largest single, and most efficient, state-of-the-art H-Class, CCGT in Singapore, with capacity of at least 600 MW. The new plant will include a large-scale Battery Energy Storage System (BESS), fashioning the first CCGT unit integrated with BESS in Singapore. The new plan will play a critical role in strengthening Singapore's energy security, enhancing grid stability and advancing the nation's transition towards a low-carbon future.

== Shareholders ==
PacificLight is owned by shareholders under the First Pacific Group and Meralco PowerGen Corporation.

First Pacific is a Hong Kong-based investment holding company with investments located in Asia-Pacific. The company’s principal investments are in consumer food products, telecommunications, infrastructure, and natural resources.

Meralco Powergen Corporation (MGEN) is a wholly owned subsidiary and the power generation arm of the Manila Electric Company (MERALCO), the largest privately owned distribution utility in the Philippines.
