= Murder of Leong Fook Weng =

2000 gang-related killing of a man in Singapore

Leong Fook Weng
- Leong Fook Weng, who was killed in 2000
- Born: Leong Fook Weng; 1964; Singapore, Malaysia
- Died: 17 May 2000 (aged 36); Bukit Timah, Singapore
- Cause of death: Fatal knife wound to the heart
- Occupations: Odd-job worker Moneylender
- Known for: Murder victim

On 17 May 2000, at a vacant plot of land in Bukit Timah, 36-year-old odd-job worker and moneylender Leong Fook Weng (Chinese: 梁福永; pinyin: Liáng Fúyǒng; Jyutping: Loeng4 Fuk1 Wing5) was found dead, wearing only his underwear and sustaining several stab wounds on his chest and neck. Investigations showed that Leong had been attacked and assaulted by four secret society members, and died as a result of a knife wound to his heart. The four attackers escaped Singapore after the killing, but two of them – See Chee Keong (Chinese: 施志强; pinyin: Shī Zhìqiáng; Jyutping: Si1 Zi3 Koeng4) and Robson Tay Teik Chai (Chinese: 郑德才; pinyin: Zhèng Décái; Pe̍h-ōe-jī: Tēⁿ Tek-châi) – were discovered to be imprisoned in Cambodia and France respectively for unrelated drug offences, and the remaining two suspects – Lim Hin Teck (Chinese: 林兴德; pinyin: Lín Xīngdé; Pe̍h-ōe-jī: Lîm Hin-tek) and Ong Chin Huat (Chinese: 王振发; pinyin: Wáng Zhènfā; Pe̍h-ōe-jī: Ông Chín-hoat) – remained at large for the murder.

Tay was repatriated from France to Singapore after completing his two-year sentence for drug trafficking, and in March 2003, Tay was sentenced to nine years in prison and given 12 strokes of the cane for a reduced charge of manslaughter. See, who was sentenced to 18 years' imprisonment for drug trafficking in Cambodia, spent 13 years in a Cambodian prison before he was given a royal pardon and released in November 2013, and returned to Singapore for trial. In April 2016, See was sentenced to ten years' jail for manslaughter. A fifth accomplice, William Ho Kah Wei (Chinese: 何嘉伟; pinyin: Hé Jiāwěi; Jyutping: Ho4 Gaa1 Wai5), who never took part in the assault but was aware of the murder and never reported it, was jailed six months in February 2003 for failure to report a crime to the police. Till today, both Ong and Lim remain at large for the crime.

== Discovery of Leong's body ==
On 17 May 2000, at about 11 am, a man clad only in his underwear was found dead in a vacant plot of land near a cemetery along Kheam Hock Road, which was located somewhere in Bukit Timah. He had several stab wounds on his body, and sustained bruises and lacerations all over his body. His shirt was also burnt, and his slippers and pager were discarded at an area near where his body was found. His wallet was also missing.

The victim was 36-year-old odd-job worker Leong Fook Weng, who was also a gang member and engaged in moneylending activities, and he went to prison twice for fighting with someone. Leong's corpse was sent for an autopsy, and the results of the post-mortem examination by Dr Wee Keng Poh certified that the cause of death was acute haemorrhage in the chest, because one of the stab wounds had penetrated Leong's heart, and the injury itself was sufficient in the ordinary course of nature to cause death. Several other stab wounds were also found on other parts of Leong's chest, as well as Leong's neck. The bruises and lacerations also gave credence to the fact that Leong had been assaulted during the stabbing that cost him his life. Leong left behind a brother and his parents at the time of his death. The death of Leong had also led to his family suffering from more dire financial straits.

== Murder investigations ==
2000 police file photo of See Chee Keong, one of the four assailants wanted for murdering Leong

2000 police file photo of Ong Chin Huat, one of the four assailants wanted for murdering Leong

The police classified the case as murder, and Inspector Zainal Abidin bin Ismail was put in charge of the police investigations. More than 150 of Leong's friends were questioned for the crime, for which the motive was not yet determined. After weeks of investigations, the police eventually found out through witnesses that Leong, who was attending a funeral wake at Upper Boon Keng Road, had been approached by at least four disorderly men who assaulted him and forcibly brought in into the vehicle of one of the men, and he was also beaten up at a petrol station in Tanjong Katong before he met his end at Kheam Hock Road. The vehicle, a white Mitsubishi Lancer, was traced and it belonged to a 34-year-old Singaporean citizen named See Chee Keong, who was recorded to have left Singapore a day after the stabbing.

See, together with his three alleged accomplices, were placed on the police's wanted list on suspicion for committing the murder of Leong Fook Weng. The other three suspects were identified as 32-year-old Lim Hin Teck (alias Lim Teck Hin), 33-year-old Robson Tay Teik Chai and 38-year-old Ong Chin Huat. Lim, Tay and Ong were also found to have departed from Singapore after they allegedly killed Leong, and all the four alleged attackers were gang members. The photographs of the fugitives and their personal information were formally released by the police to seek public assistance for information on their whereabouts, and the Singaporean authorities also sought the help of foreign jurisdictions to trace the whereabouts of the four suspects. The father of Ong Chin Huat reportedly told the press that his son, who had gone to prison many times before, had taken away his savings and he wanted Ong to come back and surrender himself for killing Leong. Under Singaporean law, offenders found guilty of murder would be sentenced to death by hanging.

On 31 May 2000, a 19-year-old National Serviceman named William Ho Kah Wei (alias Soh Tan Huat) was arrested by the police as a suspect. It was found that throughout the assault and subsequent murder of Leong, Ho was present and witnessed the crime, but had failed to report the matter to the authorities. Ho, who belonged to the same gang as some of the assailants, was therefore charged with murder.

In December 2000, the Singapore Police Force were notified that one of the murder suspects, See Chee Keong, was imprisoned in Cambodia for a drug trafficking offence. Similarly, in March 2001, Robson Tay was arrested for drug trafficking in Paris, France and the Singapore authorities were notified of his whereabouts. However, both See and Tay were not immediately brought back to Singapore for trial since they had to complete their respective court proceedings and sentences in Cambodia and France respectively before they could be handed over to the Singaporean authorities.

However, the whereabouts of the remaining two fugitives, Ong Chin Huat and Lim Hin Teck, were still unknown.

== Official version of the murder ==
Based on court documents and the media, the following was the official version of the Leong Fook Weng murder case.

Prior to the killing itself, one of the murderers, Lim Hin Teck, had a dispute with Leong over a debt which Leong owed to Lim. Not only that, Leong was a former member of an infamous gang Ang Soon Tong before he switched to another gang, known as the Lo Kuan secret society. Therefore, during the early hours of 17 May 2000, the four people - Lim, Ong Chin Huat, Robson Tay and See Chee Keong - agreed to teach Leong a lesson after they had supper at a coffee shop along River Valley Road, where they talked about their unhappiness with Leong. Tay was a member of Lo Kuan while the remaining three – See, Lim, and Ong – were part of another gang named Sio Ang Koon.

The four people rode See's car, and they met Leong at a funeral at Upper Boon Keng Road. Upon seeing Leong, both See and Tay beat up Leong, who claimed he was part of the Lo Kuan and See called the leader of Lo Kuan, Tay Kim Guan, who agreed to meet the four at a petrol station in Tanjong Katong. After the money (S$1,000 in total) was paid back to Lim and Tay Kim Guan having verified during the meeting that Leong was not part of his gang, Leong fruitlessly attempted to escape in a taxi, and the four caught him and assaulted him.

Subsequently, they dragged Leong into See's car and See drove the group and Leong to a vacant plot of land near a cemetery in Kheam Hock Road in Bukit Timah, where the group continued to assault Leong, who was stripped of his clothes until he was only wearing his undergarment. One of the attackers, See Chee Keong, used a 5 cm blade concealed in a lighter and stabbed Leong several times on the chest and neck, resulting in the death of Leong due to a stab wound to the heart. The fifth accomplice and Sio Ang Koon member, William Ho Kah Wei, was present all along throughout the events before and during Leong's killing, but kept silent and never reported the matter to the police.

After Leong died, the group took his wallet and left his corpse behind, and while Ho remained behind in Singapore, all the four alleged killers involved fled Singapore soon after the murder, although both See and Tay would be discovered serving jail terms in foreign jurisdictions for unrelated offences after the police finally traced their whereabouts.

== Conviction of William Ho ==
On 5 February 2003, 22-year-old William Ho Kah Wei was found guilty of failing to report an alleged murder offence to the police. The judge sentenced Ho to the maximum penalty of six months' imprisonment, after he found that based on the brutality of the crime and other aggravating circumstances of the case, there were no grounds for leniency in Ho's case and hence the maximum sentence should be awarded in Ho's case.

Ho had since been released as of late 2003.

== Trial of Robson Tay Teik Chai ==
=== Tay's jail term in France and extradition ===
Robson Tay, who was arrested at Changi Airport after his deportation from France to Singapore

In March 2001, the Singapore Police Force were notified that Robson Tay was in Paris, France, where he was facing trial for trafficking 5 kg of diamorphine. Tay was subsequently given a two-year jail term for the crime. Before his involvement in the murder of Leong, Tay had a long list of antecedents for various offences, starting from 1985, including being a member of a secret society, illegal money lending, cheating, and even reckless driving. There was one instance in 1997, where Tay committed an unknown crime related to violence.

On 10 July 2002, after Tay was released from prison, he was repatriated from France to Singapore, and arrested at Changi Airport upon his arrival. Tay became the first out of the four killers to be charged with murder in relation to Leong's death.

=== Tay's trial and sentence ===
On 28 February 2003, during his trial at the High Court, 36-year-old Robson Tay Teik Chai pleaded guilty to a reduced charge of culpable homicide not amounting to murder, which was equivalent to manslaughter in Singaporean legal terms. The maximum penalty for manslaughter was either life imprisonment or up to ten years in prison, with the offender liable to caning.

Tay's lawyers, Chia Boon Teck and Singa Retnam, argued in mitigation that Tay never intended to cause any bodily injury or death when he participated in the attack, and he was not armed at the time he killed Leong. Tay's counsel also said he was remorseful for his role in the death of Leong. However, the trial judge, Choo Han Teck, stated that the victim had been subjected to a long and brutal assault, and even though Tay was not armed when he assaulted Leong, his role was no less culpable than the other three assailants (especially See Chee Keong). Therefore, Justice Choo sentenced Robson Tay to nine years' imprisonment and 12 strokes of the cane for his part in the death of Leong.

As of 2013, Tay had since been released.

== Trial of See Chee Keong ==
=== Background of See ===
See Chee Keong was born in Singapore in 1966, and he had one younger brother and one sister. See only studied up to Secondary Two, and he left school to work due to his family's extreme poverty. He first joined a gang at age 16, and he opened a gambling den, and also engaged in illegal moneylending activities. See was married twice in his adulthood. From his first marriage, See had one daughter and two sons, and after his divorce in an unspecified year, See went on to marry another woman, with whom he had one son, who was a teenager as of 2016, when See was tried and convicted of killing Leong.

=== See's conviction and jail term in Cambodia ===
After murdering Leong Fook Weng back in May 2000, See Chee Keong, who was 34 at the time of the crime, fled to Thailand together with Tay and Lim, before they went their separate ways, with See heading to Cambodia while Tay went to France. Ong himself fled to another county as well.

On 3 December 2000, See was caught at Phnom Penh International Airport in Cambodia while attempting to smuggle drugs to Kuala Lumpur, Malaysia. See reportedly took up the job due to him needing to earn a living while on the run. Nevertheless, See was charged in a Cambodian court for drug trafficking, and he was sentenced to 18 years' imprisonment. During the same month of his arrest in Cambodia, the Singaporean police were notified of his presence, but See could not be extradited to Singapore immediately because there was no extradition treaty between Cambodia and Singapore.

During his incarceration at a Cambodian prison, See reportedly did not have a smooth prison life, and he also turned to Christianity. Over the years he spent in prison, See gradually became remorseful for having murdered Leong back in 2000, and was willing to return to Singapore upon his release to face legal retribution for killing Leong. See spent about 13 years behind bars before he was released through a royal pardon on 26 November 2013. See was deported to Singapore the next day and was arrested upon his arrival at Changi Airport for murdering Leong 13 years prior.

=== See's trial in Singapore ===
==== Plea of guilt ====
2013 police mugshot of See Chee Keong, who was deported to Singapore after his release from a Cambodian prison

On 20 April 2016, after standing trial at the High Court, 50-year-old See Chee Keong pleaded guilty to one count of manslaughter after the prosecution reduced his original murder charge to one of manslaughter. Although the revision of the Penal Code in 2008 allowed judges to impose either a life sentence or up to 20 years of imprisonment for manslaughter, See's crime was committed in 2000, eight years before the law revision, and hence his potential punishment would still be within the previous sentencing regime of either life or up to ten years in prison.

Deputy Public Prosecutor (DPP) Anandan Bala sought the second-highest sentence of ten years' imprisonment in See's case. He argued that the fatal attack on Leong Fook Weng was "premeditated and prolonged", and it was not committed by a single person, but a group of persons, and he said See played the most major role behind the killing because See was the person who inflicted the fatal knife wound during the stabbing and directly caused Leong's death. He also stated that after the attack, See ran off to Cambodia to escape justice and committed another crime in that country, and the attack itself had connections to the underworld and done out of secret society violence, and therefore the sentence in See's case should carry the emphasis of deterrence and retribution against crimes that involved gang violence.

On the other hand, See's lawyer James Bahadur Masih requested for a sentence of eight years' jail, and he submitted in mitigation that See was deeply remorseful for having murdered Leong 16 years ago and he led a miserable life while on the run and during the time he was imprisoned in Cambodia, and he missed his family a lot during those past 13 years as a fugitive, and See hoped to spend the final years of his life as both a good father and grandfather to his children and grandson. Masih also stated that instead of having the intent to cause serious harm or death, the real purpose of the attack was to teach Leong a lesson for his gang disloyalty and See had consumed three different kinds of drugs, which may have had an influence on his state of mind and conduct at the time of the stabbing. Additionally, See's family also wrote letters to the judge pleading for leniency in his case, and his children also told the judge that despite what See had done, they still loved him because See was a loving and caring father to his children. See's daughter, who was then married with a son, expressed that she had made arrangements for her father to live with her upon his release.

==== Sentence ====
On the same day See pleaded guilty to manslaughter, Justice Chan Seng Onn, the trial judge, promptly returned with a verdict, sentencing 50-year-old See Chee Keong to ten years in jail, the exact penalty requested by the prosecution, and backdate the jail term to See's date of arrest in November 2013. Although caning was also imposed for offences of manslaughter aside from imprisonment, See was spared the cane due to him having attained the age of 50 at the time of sentencing.

Delivering his oral grounds of decision, Justice Chan stated that the case against See was full of aggravating factors, given that See was the only person armed with a deadly weapon and also fatally stabbed the victim to death. He also pointed out that See had fled Singapore soon after he killed Leong and evaded justice for a prolonged period of time, and since See's age of 50 had spared him from caning, he saw no room for a discount of the stipulated ten-year sentence he imposed, and he agreed with the prosecution's arguments that such a sentence was justified in See's case. Despite his sentencing remarks, Justice Chan personally addressed See, telling him that he was fortunate that his family and children were willing to accept and love him, noting that See's daughter had plans to allow her father to live with her and her son, and the judge told See that he hoped See would learn his lesson and stay away from crime ever again after his release.

See's family were reportedly thankful to hear the sentence, and they were looking forward to reuniting with him. See's 49-year-old younger brother, See Kok Keong, said that the family were supportive of See and they wanted him to return to Singapore to accept responsibility for his crime. See Kok Keong was present in court with See's sister, as well as See's ex-wife and his three elder children. He noted that his older brother was a changed man after converting to Christianity and was willing to face the consequences for his actions, and made peace with himself. See, who became tearful when sentence was passed, accepted his punishment and was allowed to speak to his family before he left the courtroom. There was no appeal filed against the sentence.

Should he serve with good behavior, See, whose jail term of ten years took effect from November 2013, would be released on parole after completing at least two-thirds of his sentence (equivalent to six years and eight months). Since November 2023, See had been released from Changi Prison.

== Current status of Ong and Lim ==
Till today, the remaining two perpetrators, Lim Hin Teck and Ong Chin Huat, remain on the run for their part in the murder of Leong Fook Weng.

== See also ==
- Caning in Singapore
- List of major crimes in Singapore
