= Tuas South Incineration Plant =

Waste incineration facility in Singapore

Coordinates: 1.2965°N 103.6205°E

Tuas South Incineration Plant is the largest waste incineration facility in Singapore. It was commissioned in June 2000. The plant can incinerate 3000 tonnes of garbage every day. The incineration reduces the waste volume by 90%. The plant occupies 10.5 ha of reclaimed land. It was constructed at a cost of S$890 million. The plant also generate 80 MW of electricity.

Tuas South Incineration Plant is also the site where ballot papers and ballot boxes used in recent elections in Singapore are incinerated after being stored inside the Supreme Court for six months, under the instruction from Elections Department Singapore, to maintain secrecy of the electorate and election integrity.

== See also ==
- Water supply and sanitation in Singapore
