= Jurong Island Highway =

Road in Singapore

Coordinates: 1.29258°N 103.7116°E

- Lebuhraya Pulau Jurong (Malay) 裕廊岛大道 (Chinese) ஜூரோங் தீவு விரைவுச்சாலை (Tamil)
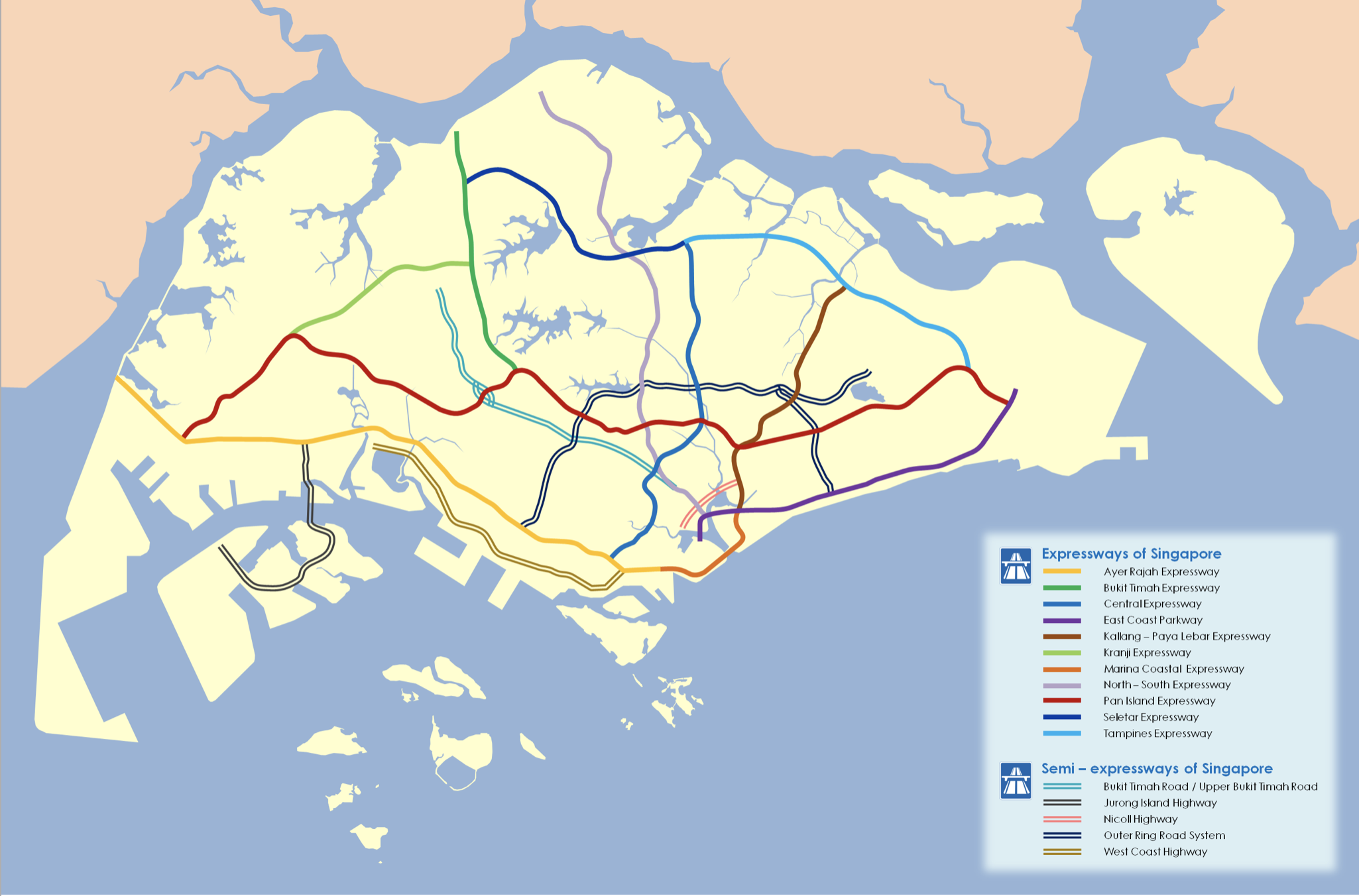
- Jurong Island Highway is labelled in double grey line

Route information
- Existed: March 1999–present

Major junctions
- North end: AYE
- West end: Jurong Island

Location
- Country: Singapore

Highway system
- Expressways of Singapore

The Jurong Island Highway (Chinese: 裕廊岛大道; Malay: Lebuhraya Pulau Jurong; Tamil: ஜூரோங் தீவு விரைவுச்சாலை) is a major highway in Singapore which links Jurong Pier Road in Jurong Port of the main island to Jurong Island. It was opened in March 1999. It is also the only highway within Jurong Island.

There are plans to build a second causeway to link the Western end of Jurong Island Highway and Gul Road in Jurong Industrial Estate, Mainland Singapore but the plan was put on hold due to the possibility that the causeway might affect the passage of ships to the shipyards in the Southern part of Jurong Industrial Area.

A speed camera (limit 70km/h) was set up in 2009 next to the CNG station.

In 23 August 2026, Prime Minister Lawrence Wong announced the building of a second road link between Jurong Island and the mainland in his National Day Rally speech to supplement the existing single highway.

== History ==
Plans for the Jurong Island Highway were first announced in August 1988 as part of Phase I of the S$530 million (1988) (US$263.36 million) Jurong Port expansion programme, a two-lane 343 metres (375 yd) long causeway that would connect Pulau Dama Laut to mainland Singapore. In July 1991, it was announced that there were plans to merge seven Southern islands into a "chemical" island via a causeway between Pulau Seraya, Pulau Ayer Merbau, and Pulau Sakra. Construction for said 1.6 kilometres (0.99 mi) causeway started by December, with completion by March 1993.

External Media
- Construction of the Pulau Merlimau causeway

== List of interchanges ==
Interchange with^{1}	Type	Remarks	Name of interchange
Boon Lay Flyover and Ayer Rajah Expressway (AYE)			
Jalan Pesawat			
Jurong Bird Park			
Jalan Buroh Flyover and Jalan Buroh			
Jurong Pier Way			
Jurong Pier Amenity Centre			
Jurong Island Causeway (2.3 km)			
Jurong Island Industrial Estate			
Jurong Island			
