= Honest John =

Honest John may refer to:

== Politicians ==
=== United Kingdom ===
- John Battersby, councillor in Glasgow and trade union leader
- John Bowen (alderman), High Sheriff of Worcestershire
- John Fielden, British politician
- Mad Jack Fuller, British politician who preferred to be known as "Honest John" Fuller
- John Lilburne (1614 – 1657), English Leveller during the English Civil Wars

=== United States ===
- John Davis (Massachusetts governor)
- John H. Farley, Mayor of Cleveland
- John Hart (New Jersey politician)
- John Hunn (governor), Governor of Delaware
- John Kelly (New York politician), Tammany Hall politician
- John Letcher, Governor of Virginia
- John Lind (politician), Governor of Minnesota
- John Moore (Illinois), Lieutenant-Governor of Illinois
- John J. Patterson (1830–1912) United States senator from South Carolina
- John Holbrook Powers, Nebraska politician
- John F. Shafroth, Governor of Colorado
- John Sparks (Nevada politician)
- John Walsh (Dakota politician)
- John Whiteaker, Governor of Oregon
- John J. Williams (senator)

=== Elsewhere ===
- John Martin (Young Irelander), Irish politician
- John Tonkin, Australian politician
- John White (New Zealand politician)

== Athletes ==
- John Anderson (outfielder), baseball player
- John Barham Day, jockey
- John Clapp (baseball), baseball player
- John Eubank, baseball player
- John Gaffney (baseball), baseball umpire
- John Kelly, baseball player nicknamed "Kick Kelly" and "Honest John"
- John McCloskey (baseball manager)
- John McKenna, rugby player
- John Morrill, baseball player
- John A. Warren, football player
- John Katan, wrestler

== Fictional characters ==
- "Honest John" Worthington Foulfellow, a character in Disney's 1940 film Pinocchio
- a character in the 1986 An American Tail
- a character in Marvel Comics' S-Men
- a character in Belle of the Yukon
- the protagonist of an 1875 novel by John William De Forest

== Other uses ==
- Honest John Plain, guitarist with The Boys
- the MGR-1 Honest John, a nuclear-capable missile
- John Philip Wood, Scots historian
- John Brown Russwurm, abolitionist
- John Crocker, officer in the British Army
- John Roberts, 18th-century Irish architect
- John Stephenson (coachbuilder)
- a 1959 single produced by Felton Jarvis
- Honest Jon's, a record store
- "Honest John", a type of open bar where patrons serve themselves and leave payment in a jar or drawer, on the honor system.
