= Ng Teck Lee =

Singaporean fugitive and alleged fraudster

- Born: c. 1966 (age 59–60); Singapore
- Occupation: Businessman
- Known for: Alleged fraudster and former chief executive officer of recycling company Citiraya Industries
- Criminal status: Arrested (2024)
- Spouse: Thor Chwee Hwa

Ng Teck Lee (born c. 1966) is a Singaporean businessman and alleged fraudster. The former chief executive officer and president of recycling company Citiraya Industries, he fled Singapore in 2005 while under investigation for the misappropriation of S$72 million worth of electronic waste. In December 2024, he was arrested in Malaysia and extradited to Singapore.

== Business career ==
A high school dropout, Ng briefly worked as a truck driver for a plastics-recycling company before co-founding Citiraya Industries with his elder brother, Raymond Ng Ah Hua, in 1988. Ng Teck Lee served as the company’s chief executive officer, while his brother held the position of general manager.

By 2002, Citiraya had expanded its operations to at least eleven countries and was entrusted with recycling electronic waste from manufacturers such as AMD, Agilent, Cisco, Infineon, Intel, and STMicroelectronics. The company reportedly employed around seventy people at the time.

In 2006, Citiraya Industries was rebranded as Centillion Environment & Recycling. The company later merged with an American firm in 2012 and was renamed Metech International.

== Fraud allegations ==
In December 2004, a U.S.-based client of Citiraya Industries filed a complaint after discovering that its scrap computer chips had surfaced in Taiwan instead of being recycled and crushed in Singapore. In response, Taiwanese authorities raided several local firms associated with Citiraya in January 2005. Around the same time, the Corrupt Practices Investigation Bureau (CPIB) in Singapore launched an investigation into Citiraya's operations. Before 19 January 2005, Ng fled Singapore, prompting the issuance of an Interpol Red Notice for his arrest.

The CPIB subsequently charged Ng with misappropriating 89 tonnes (88 long tons; 98 short tons) of electronic waste between 2003 and 2004. Instead of being properly recycled, the waste was allegedly diverted to his brother-in-law's warehouse and sold to buyers in Hong Kong and Taiwan. Additionally, the CPIB found that Citiraya had engaged in 1,554 fraudulent transactions amounting to approximately S$161 million and that Ng had paid out S$1.8 million in bribes.

Several individuals linked to Ng were arrested and convicted for their involvement, including his brother, Ng Teck Boon, who was sentenced to eight years' imprisonment in 2005. In August 2008, the Attorney-General of Singapore filed an application with the High Court of Singapore to forfeit approximately S$28 million worth of Ng's assets under the Corruption, Drug Trafficking and Other Serious Crimes (Confiscation of Benefits) Act. In September 2011, the court ordered S$24 million of Ng’s assets to be liquidated, with the remaining S$4 million distributed among Centillion Environment & Recycling, Malaysian businessman Ung Yoke Hooi, and Ng’s brother-in-law Thor Beng Huat.

On 3 December 2024, after more than nineteen years on the run, Ng and his wife were arrested in Johor Bahru, Malaysia by the Malaysian Anti-Corruption Commission (MACC). They were extradited to Singapore the same day. On 24 December, both were denied bail after prosecutors successfully argued that they had the means to escape from Singapore's jurisdiction as they were using fake identification documents while abroad and had funds overseas. As of 28 May 2025, the case was still under CPIB's investigation.

On 8 May 2026, his wife Thor Chwee Hwa was sentenced to a year and 10 months’ jail after admitting to opening a bank account used to receive ill-gotten gains.

On 20 May 2026, he received an additional 38 charges for offences including corruption and theft.

== Personal life ==
Ng is married to Thor Chwee Hwa (born c. 1969). The couple jointly owned a bungalow in Binjai Park and a 7,300 square feet (680 m^{2}) residence in Paya Lebar.
