= Corruption in Singapore =

Corruption in Singapore is mostly contained. The Republic of Singapore is generally perceived as one of the least corrupt countries in the world. Cases are mostly handled by the Singapore Corrupt Practices Investigation Bureau (CPIB), a government agency in Singapore that investigates and prosecutes corruption in the public and private sectors. According to a Transparency International survey, an overwhelming majority of people in Singapore view cases of corruption by public officials or institutions as an extremely rare occurrence. In 2025, Singapore's public sector was ranked by Transparency International as the third least corrupt in the world.

== Overview ==
Transparency International's 2025 Corruption Perceptions Index scored 182 countries on a scale from 0 ("highly corrupt") to 100 ("very clean") and ranked the countries by score. Singapore received a score of 84 and was ranked third, where the country that ranked first is perceived to have the most honest public sector. For comparison with worldwide scores, the best score was 89 (ranked 1st), the average score was 42, and the worst score was 9 (ranked 181st, in a two-way tie). For comparison with regional scores, the best score among the countries of the Asia Pacific region (Note: Afghanistan, Australia, Bangladesh, Bhutan, Brunei Darussalam, Cambodia, China, Fiji, Hong Kong, India, Indonesia, Japan, North Korea, South Korea, Laos, Malaysia, Maldives, Mongolia, Myanmar, Nepal, New Zealand, Pakistan, Papua New Guinea, Philippines, Singapore, Solomon Islands, Sri Lanka, Taiwan, Thailand, Timor-Leste, Vanuatu, and Vietnam) was 84—also held by Singapore. The average score in the region was 45 and the worst score was 15.

According to Transparency International's 2015 "Government Defence Anti-Corruption Index", the highest corruption risk area is "Operations" followed by "Finance".

Business executives surveyed in the World Economic Forum's 2014–2015 Global Competitiveness Report reported no problems doing business in Singapore.

One theory of Singapore's low corruption is that, compared to neighboring nations such as Thailand and Malaysia, the powers of the state were able to pressure private interests into funneling capital into sectors that would ultimately benefit the public in the long term.

== Indicators of corruption ==
Common measurements of corruption in Singapore
Year	Corruption Perceptions Index (Note: The Corruption Perceptions Index ranks countries based on how corrupt a country's public sector is perceived to be. It is a composite index, drawing on corruption-related data from expert and business surveys carried out by a variety of independent and reputable institutions.Scores range from 0 (highly corrupt) to 100 (very clean). Prior to 2012, the scope is up to scale of 10.)		Bribes Payer Index (Note: Bribe Payers Index ranks the world's wealthiest and most economically influential countries according to the likelihood of their firms to bribe abroad. Scores range from 0 to 10, indicating the likelihood of firms headquartered in these countries to bribe when operating abroad. The higher the score for the country, the lower the likelihood of companies from this country to engage in bribery when doing business abroad. Source: Transparency International)		Control of Corruption (Note: Control of corruption reflects perceptions of the extent to which public power is exercised for private gain. This includes both petty and grand forms of corruption, as well as "capture" of the state by elites and private interests. It is one of the six dimensions of the Worldwide Governance Indicators.Point estimates range from about -2.5 to 2.5. Higher values correspond to better governance outcomes. Source: World Bank)	
Year	Rank	Score	Rank	Score	Rank	Score
2010	1/178	9.3/10	-	-	99%	2.18370827
2011	5/183	9.2/10	8/28	8.3/10	-	-
2012	5/176	87/100	-	-	-	-
2013	5/177	86/100	-	-	-	-
2014	7/175	84/100	-	-	-	-
2015	8/168	85/100	-	-	-	-
2016	7/168	84/100	-	-	-	-
2017	6/180	84/100	-	-	-	-
2018	3/180	85/100	-	-	-	-
2019	4/180	85/100	-	-	-	-
2020	4/180	85/100	-	-	-	-
2021	4/180	85/100	-	-	-	-
2022	5/180	83/100	-	-	-	-
2023	5/180	83/100	-	-	-	-
2024	3/180	84/100	-	-	-	-
2025	3/182	84/100				

== Notable incidents ==
While corruption is low in Singapore, below were a few notable Singaporean corruption-related incidents in both the public and private sector and their subsequent conclusion.

=== Tan Kia Gan (1966) ===
In August 1966, Tan Kia Gan, a former Minister for National Development (1960–1963), was investigated for attempting to assist businessman Lim Tjin Hauw and his son William Lim in securing the sale of a Boeing aircraft to Malaysian Airways. In exchange, he received 70,000 shares valued at S$1 each. As Tan lost his parliamentary seat in the 1963 general elections, he was administratively relieved of all his public appointments by the Singaporean government.

=== Wee Toon Boon (1975) ===
In 1975, Wee Toon Boon, a Minister of State for Defence and the Environment, was found guilty of corruption and sentenced to four years and six months in prison, which was reduced to 18 months upon appeal.

=== Phey Yew Kok (1979) ===
In 1979, Phey Yew Kok, the chairman of the National Trades Union Congress and a Member of Parliament for Boon Teck SMC, was charged with misuse of union funds and criminal breach of trust. Phey went on the run for the next 35 years until he surrendered to the Singapore embassy in Bangkok in 2015. Phey later pleaded guilty to 12 of the 34 charges against him and was sentenced to 60 months' imprisonment.

=== Teh Cheang Wan (1986) ===
In 1986, Teh Cheang Wan, the Minister for National Development, was investigated by the Corrupt Practices Investigation Bureau (CPIB) for alleged corruption. Teh committed suicide on 14 December 1986 before he could be charged in court.

=== Koh Seah Wee & Christopher Lim Chai Meng (2011) ===
In 2011, Koh Seah Wee, a former deputy director of technology and infrastructure in the Singapore Land Authority (SLA), and Christopher Lim Chai Meng, a former manager in the SLA, were found guilty by the High Court of cheating and money laundering charges. Koh was sentenced to 22 years in prison after admitting to 59 charges and Lim was sentenced to 15 years after admitting to 49 charges. Of the S$12.2 million laundered, S$7.5 million was recovered from Koh. Koh and Lim had cheated the SLA by using false invoices issued by former swimming coach Ho Yen Teck, who had set up seven sole proprietorships to provide fake IT maintenance services and goods that were not delivered. Ho was jailed for 10 years for the conspiracy.

=== Peter Lim Sin Pang (2012) ===
On 19 December 2011, Peter Lim Sin Pang, former commissioner of the Singapore Civil Defence Force, was arrested by the Corrupt Practices Investigation Bureau (CPIB) while Ng Boon Gay, former chief of the Central Narcotics Bureau, was also taken in for questioning by the CPIB on 4 January 2012. Both men were being investigated in connection with the Prevention of Corruption Act relating to an IT contract, and in late January 2012, it was announced that they also faced disciplinary action by the Public Service Commission, which oversees the conduct of civil servants. The two men were then interdicted, a step only taken when an individual "faces serious offences for which criminal proceedings or proceedings for his dismissal or reduction in rank are being contemplated."

Lee Hsien Loong, the Prime Minister, promised that the CPIB would follow through with the probe. The CPIB's subsequent silence on the investigations came under the scrutiny of some Members of Parliament during a parliamentary sitting in February 2012. Teo Chee Hean, the Deputy Prime Minister and Minister for Home Affairs, defended the CPIB, stating that any announcement on the outcome of the probe would have been premature and might have compromised the investigations. He also assured Parliament that all the findings of the investigations would be publicly reported once they had been finalised.

In 2013, Lim was found guilty of corruptly obtaining sexual gratification from three women and sentenced to six months' imprisonment, while Ng was acquitted of four charges of corruptly obtaining sexual gratification from a woman.

=== Bernard Lim Yong Soon (2012) ===
In July 2012, the purchase of 26 Brompton foldable bicycles (at the cost of S$2,000 each) by the National Parks Board (NParks) sparked a nationwide uproar after it was revealed by a whistleblower on the online forum HardwareZone of possible corruption and numerous red flags in the way the procurement was done. Khaw Boon Wan, the Minister of National Development, initially defended the NParks's purchase of the foldable bicycles.

A subsequent investigation by the Corrupt Practices Investigation Bureau (CPIB) resulted in the arrest of Bernard Lim Yong Soon, an assistant director at NParks. Lim was found guilty of lying to auditors about his relationship with the bicycle firm, which was awarded the tender, and given the maximum fine of S$5,000.

=== Edwin Yeo Seow Hiong (2013) ===
On 23 July 2013, Edwin Yeo Seow Hiong of the Corrupt Practices Investigation Bureau (CPIB) was charged with misappropriating at least S$1.7 million from the CPIB between 2008 and 2012. Yeo was interdicted from his position as head of field research and technical support at the CPIB to assist in a Commercial Affairs Department probe into his suspected financial impropriety. Eight of the charges were for misappropriating funds and criminal breach of trust, one was for forgery and the rest were for using part of his ill-got gains to gamble at the Marina Bay Sands casino. On 20 February 2014, Yeo was sentenced to 10 years in prison.

=== Lim Cheng Hoe (2014) ===
On 20 February 2014, Lim Cheng Hoe, a former protocol chief at the Ministry of Foreign Affairs, was sentenced to 15 months' jail for cheating. From February 2008 to May 2012, Lim had made false claims for S$89,000 worth of pineapple tarts and wine as gifts for foreign diplomats.

=== Victor Wong Chee Meng (2016) ===
In 2016, Victor Wong Chee Meng, the general manager and secretary of Ang Mo Kio Town Council, was removed from his position and investigated by the Corrupt Practices Investigation Bureau after a complaint was lodged in September 2016 over "the way he handles contracts and dealings in the town council". Wong, a Public Service Medal recipient, was concurrently an employee of CPG Facilities Management, the appointed managing agent of the town council. On 14 March 2018, Wong was charged with 55 counts of corruption for receiving some S$107,000 in bribes from Chia Sin Lan and Alisa Yip Fong Yin, the directors of two building and repair companies. Wong and Chia pleaded guilty during the trial and were sentenced to 27 months and 21 months in prison, respectively. After appealing against their sentences, both had their sentences extended to 39 months and 33 months, respectively.

=== Alleged Keppel Corporation bribery (2017) ===
According to United States prosecutors, Keppel Corporation's offshore and marine arm, Keppel O&M, agreed to pay a US$422 million settlement to avoid a criminal trial for bribing Brazilian officials. Court documents released by the United States Department of Justice revealed that Keppel O&M paid US$55 million in bribes between 2001 and 2014, to win 13 contracts with Petrobras and Sete Brasil – two Brazilian oil companies deeply mired in the country's wide-ranging Operation Car Wash graft scandal. Keppel Corporation is one of the government-linked companies (GLCs) under Temasek Holdings. It was the biggest corruption case involving a GLC in Singapore's history.

The Corrupt Practices Investigation Bureau started investigations on the six former Keppel O&M employees who were involved in the case. The investigations had to be closed in 2023 due to insufficient evidence and the inability to summon key witnesses from other countries. Six former Keppel O&M employees received warnings in lieu of prosecution.

=== Rajkumar Padmanathan (2018) ===
Rajkumar Padmanathan, a former Republic of Singapore Air Force engineer, was sentenced to 25 months and six weeks' imprisonment on 27 July 2018 on 28 counts of corruption, cheating, and breaching the Official Secrets Act while working at Tengah Air Base and Sembawang Air Base. He had leaked tender quotations in order to secure contracts for companies set up by his wife Jayashree, his friend Jeevan Arumugam, and his acquaintance Kamal Kishore. The total value of contracts awarded to Goodwill Aviation Systems, Eagle Flight Aviation Services, Duratech and Global Trade Well set up for the scam was S$1,817,379.87 from 2008 to 2014.

=== S. Iswaran (2023) ===
In July 2023, the Corrupt Practices Investigation Bureau (CPIB) formally opened an investigation into S. Iswaran, the Minister for Transport, and arrested him along with property tycoon Ong Beng Seng. Although both men were released on bail, Iswaran was interdicted and his ministerial pay was reduced to S$8,500.

On 9 January 2024, Chan Chun Sing, the Minister-in-charge of the Public Service and Minister for Education, issued a parliamentary reply that investigations into Iswaran were completed and that the Attorney General's Chambers were reviewing the case. Nine days later, Iswaran arrived at the State Courts where the charges against him were read for the first time.

Iswaran became the first minister to be investigated for corruption in Singapore since 1986 and the first minister to be charged and to face trial in court since 1975. 27 charges were handed down against Iswaran: two charges were for corruptly obtaining favours to advance Ong's business interests through contracts between the Singapore Tourism Board and a private company chaired by Ong; 24 charges were for obtaining valuable items from Ong without any consideration; and one charge was for obstructing the course of justice. Iswaran was represented by Davinder Singh during his trial.

During the trial on 23 September, two charges were added under Section 165 of the Penal Code. On 24 September, the prosecution went ahead with only four charges of obtaining valuable items as a public servant and one charge of obstructing the course of justice against Iswaran, who pleaded guilty to all five charges. On 3 October, he was sentenced to 12 months' imprisonment.

He was placed on the Home Detention Scheme on 7 February 2025.

It was reported on 7 June 2025 that he had completed his sentence.

== See also ==
- Political
  - Dynastic politics in Singapore
  - Gerrymandering of political constituencies in Singapore
  - Lack of political freedom of expression in Singapore
  - Nepotism in Singapore politics
- Crime in Singapore
