= Honesty bar =

Unstaffed bar, typically in hotels

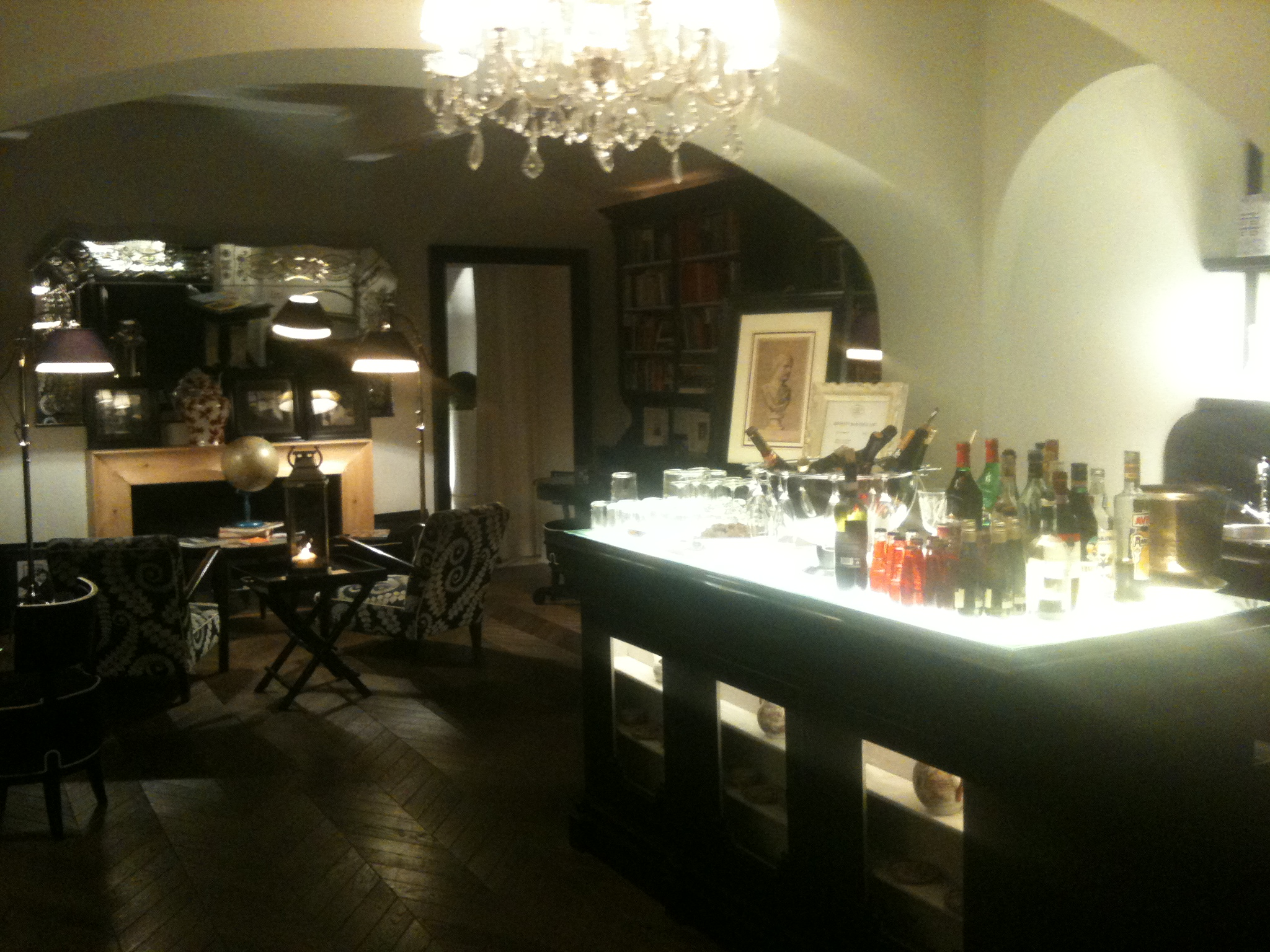
Honesty Bar at the Hotel Cellai, Florence

An honesty bar is an unattended beverage bar, typically in the lobby or lounge of a hotel, where payment is left to the guest. Honesty bars differ significantly from in-room mini-bars, where any consumption is automatically charged to the guest's account.

Honesty bars are less common than staffed bars, but can be found in a number of boutique hotels and other small hotels, and the executive floors of fine hotels. No staff attend the bar and therefore it is left to the honesty of the guest to report their own consumption. Honesty bars are convenient, since a guest can make or serve a drink at any time, keeping a tab for themself for the length of the stay. Generally drinks are cheaper in an honesty bar, since no staff must be paid to attend the area continuously.

Honesty bars are generally stocked with popular beverages, mixers, and feature a standard bar setup. It is common to find a manual of basic cocktails.

== See also ==
- Honor system
- Honesty box
