= Take a penny, leave a penny =

Tray for sharing coins

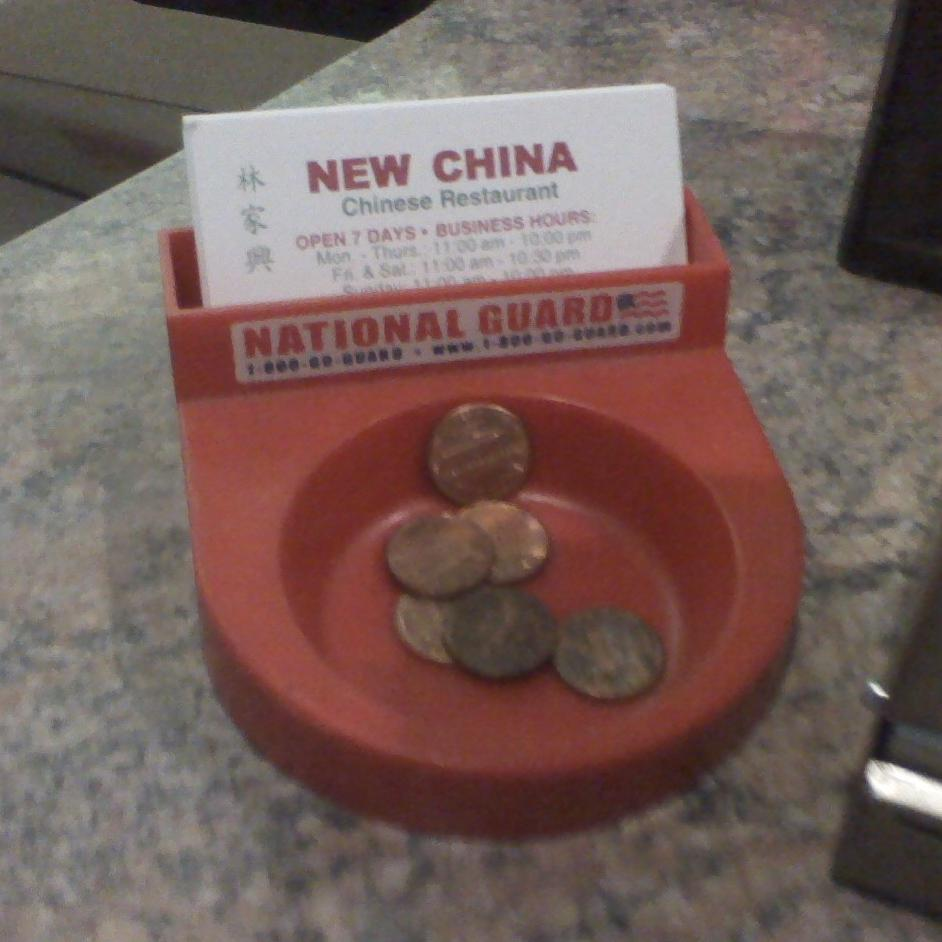
A "take a penny, leave a penny" tray in a restaurant

"Take a penny, leave a penny" (sometimes "Give a penny, take a penny", penny tray, or penny pool) refers to a tray used for convenience in cash transactions. They are found in the United States and Ireland, in gas stations and convenience stores, and were once common in Canada before 2013 when the penny was taken out of circulation.

== Usage ==
A small tray near a cash register is designated as a place for customers to discard unwanted pennies received as change. For customers who want to avoid breaking a higher-denomination coin or bill, they can take a penny or two from the tray left by others.

The tray can also be used by cashiers. For example, the cashier might take a penny from the tray to then give the customer one quarter instead of six coins totaling 24 cents (two dimes and four pennies). These are also called "penny pools".

== See also ==
- Cash rounding
- Honesty box
- Penny debate in the United States
