= Law enforcement in Singapore =

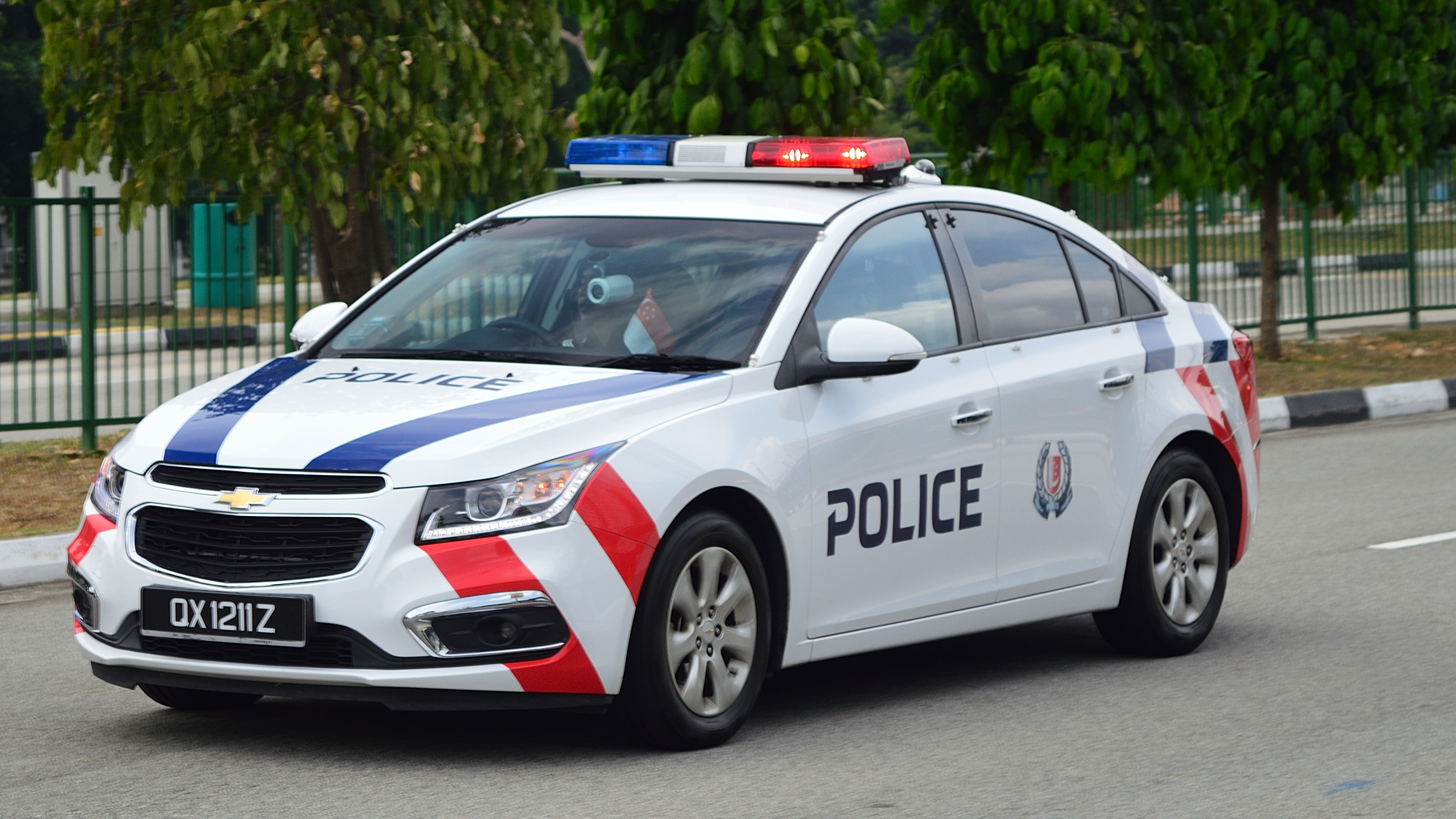
A Singaporean police vehicle

In Singapore, law enforcement is principally led by the Singapore Police Force (SPF), and supported by other agencies including the Singapore Prison Service, Central Narcotics Bureau, Corrupt Practices Investigation Bureau, Internal Security Department, Immigration and Checkpoints Authority, and Singapore Customs. Furthermore, some law enforcement powers may be exercised by non-government entities such as auxiliary police forces and security officers.

Singapore's law enforcement system has resulted in crime being extremely low as compared to other developed nations and the world in general. According to the Economist Intelligence Unit (EIU) Safe Cities Index, Singapore was often ranked as the safest or one of the safest in the world, especially in regard to digital, personal, and infrastructure security. The country also ranks highly on the Global Peace Index, being consistently placed in the top 10 and the highest in Asia for the past decade.

Foreign travel advisories for Singapore often state that petty crime such as pickpocketing and street theft is extremely rare in Singapore. Violent crime is also deemed extremely rare and almost non-existent. Threats of terrorism remain a major concern, as is the case with most developed countries. As a constant reminder from consular to possible drug traffickers, penalties for drug offences such as trafficking in Singapore remain severe and may include capital punishment. The Overseas Security Advisory Council (OSAC) of the United States Department of State states Singapore as being a very low-threat location for crime directed at or affecting "official U.S. government interests". The foreign advisory of the Ministry of Foreign Affairs of China also considers Singapore as a low-risk country.

== Governmental law enforcement and regulatory agencies ==
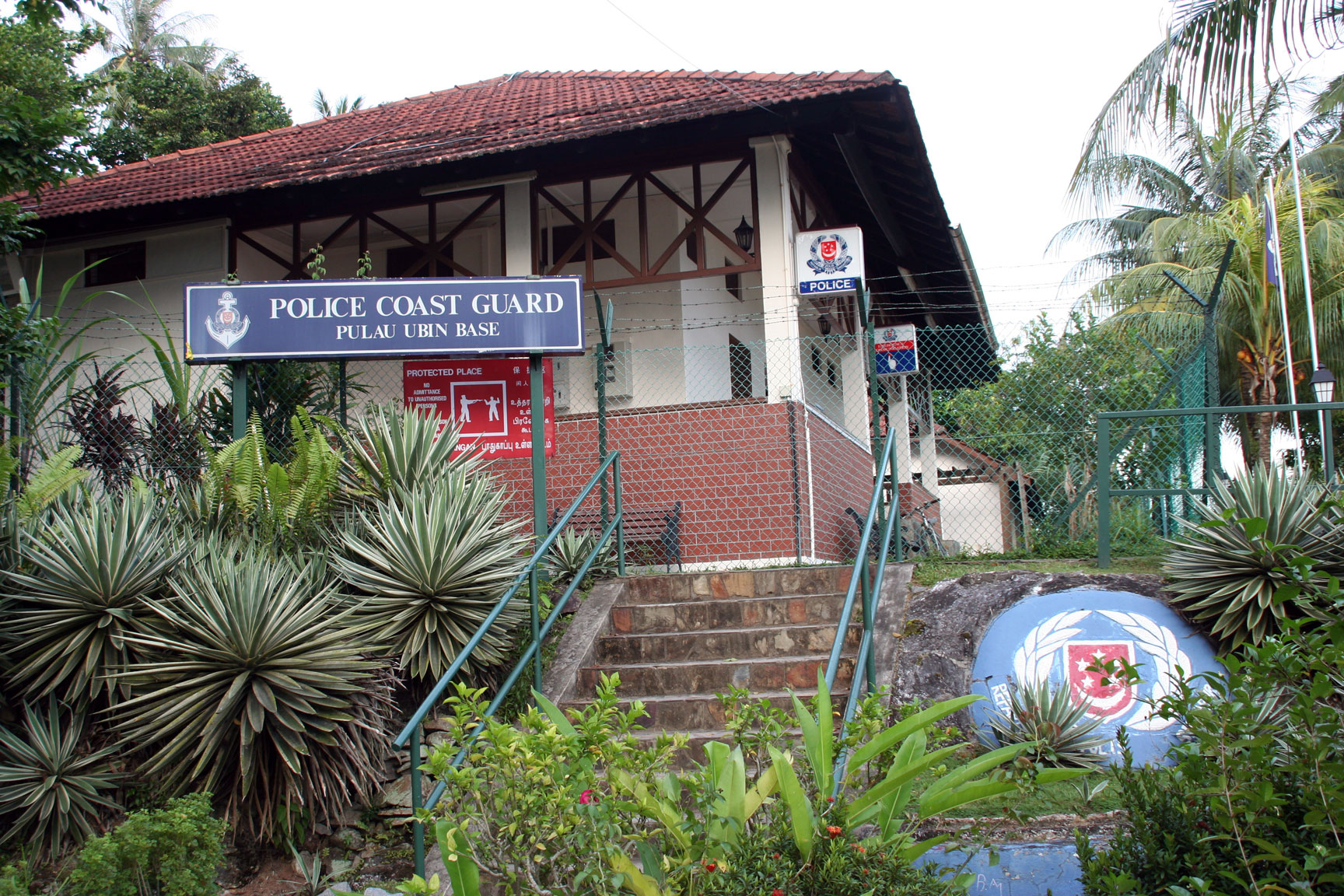
Police Coast Guard's Pulau Ubin Base in 2005

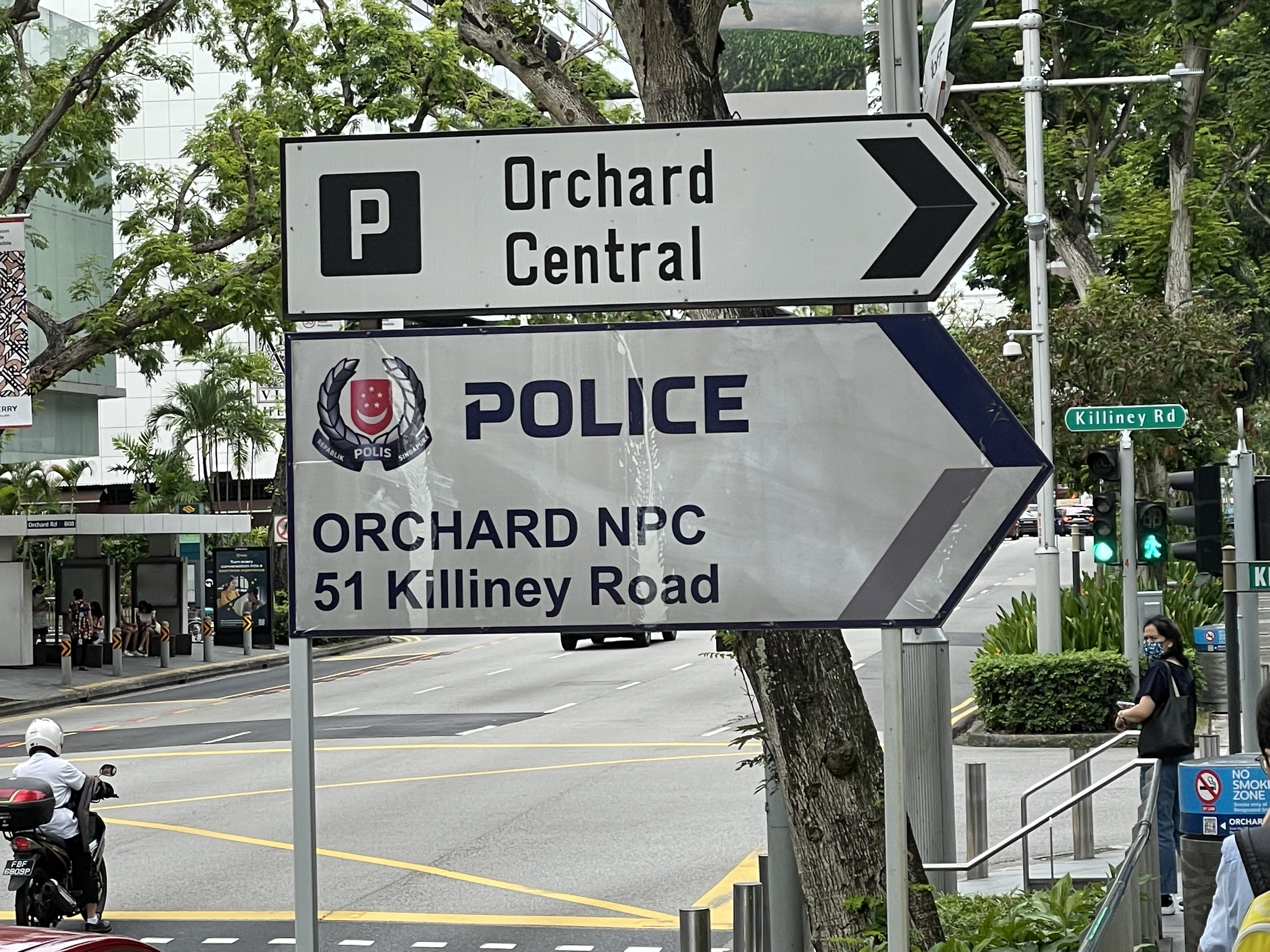
A sign to the Orchard neighbourhood police centre (NPC), indicating its location.

=== Singapore Police Force ===
The Singapore Police Force is the main government agency tasked with maintaining law and order in the city-state. It was founded in 1820, and is under the supervision of the Ministry of Home Affairs.

=== Singapore Prison Service ===
The Singapore Prison Service (SPS) was formed in 1946 and operates the prison system in Singapore, under the supervision of the Ministry of Home Affairs. Under the Prisons Act 1933, a prison officer has the powers of a police officer (Section 32), and may be armed (Section 31).

=== Corrupt Practices Investigation Bureau ===
The Corrupt Practices Investigation Bureau (CPIB) is a government agency in Singapore which investigates and prosecutes corruption in the public and private sectors. It was founded in 1952. Although the primary function is to investigate corruption, it is empowered to investigate other criminal cases in which corruption may be involved. Under the purview of the Prime Minister's Office, the CPIB is headed by a director who reports directly to the Prime Minister.

A CPIB officer has the powers of arrest under Section 15 of the Prevention of Corruption Act 1960, and may also investigate any other offence under written law which may be uncovered during investigations under Section 17 of the same Act. A CPIB officer may also be armed under Section 87 of the Guns, Explosives and Weapons Control Act 2021 and Section 15A of the Prevention of Corruption Act 1960.

=== Internal Security Department ===
The Internal Security Department (ISD) is a domestic intelligence agency of the Ministry of Home Affairs founded in 1966. It has the utmost right to detain without trial individuals suspected to be a threat to national security. The stated mission is to confront and address security threats, including foreign subversion and espionage. The ISD also monitors and addresses the prevention of racial tension which might affect the public peace, surveillance, apprehension of militants, and protection of Singapore's national borders. Under Section 65 of the Police Force Act 2004, an intelligence officer has the powers of a police officer. Under Section 87 of the Guns, Explosives and Weapons Control Act 2021, an intelligence officer may be armed.

=== Security and Intelligence Division ===
The Security and Intelligence Division (SID) is a foreign intelligence agency under the Ministry of Defence founded in 1966 alongside the ISD. Under Section 65 of the Police Force Act 2004, an intelligence officer has the powers of a police officer. Under Section 87 of the Guns, Explosives and Weapons Control Act 2021, an intelligence officer may be armed.

=== Singapore Armed Forces Military Police Command ===
The Singapore Armed Forces Military Police Command (SAFMPC) is the military police formation of the Singapore Armed Forces (SAF), founded in 1966.

=== Central Narcotics Bureau ===
The Central Narcotics Bureau (CNB) is in charge of enforcement of drug law and drug education. It was founded in 1971. A CNB officer has the powers of a police officer and may be armed under Sections 32 and 32A of the Misuse of Drugs Act 1973.

=== Singapore Civil Defence Force Provost Unit ===
The Singapore Civil Defence Force Provost Unit (PU) is responsible for enforcement and investigation of all service offences as found in the Civil Defence Act as well as the administration of the SCDF Detention Barracks.

=== Inland Revenue Authority of Singapore ===
The Inland Revenue Authority of Singapore (IRAS) is a statutory board founded in 1992 and under the Ministry of Finance for the collection of taxation revenue. Under section 65F of the Income Tax Act, and section 83E of the Good and Services Tax Act, an officer of IRAS may arrest for offences under the same acts. Furthermore, under section 65H of the Income Tax Act, and section 83G of the Goods and Services Tax Act, an officer of IRAS may also be armed.

=== Land Transport Authority ===
The Land Transport Authority (LTA) is a statutory board founded in 1995 and under the Ministry of Transport to execute transport policy. Under section 39 of the Land Transport Authority of Singapore Act, an officer of the LTA may exercise powers of a police officer in enforcing sections of the Road Traffic Act and also arrest for such offences.

=== Ministry of Manpower ===
The Ministry of Manpower (MOM) is a ministry established in 1998 to oversee labor policies. Under section 18 of the Employment Agencies Act and section 21 of the Employment of Foreign Manpower Act, inspectors of employment agencies and employment are permitted to arrest for offenses against the same acts.

=== Immigration and Checkpoints Authority ===
The Immigration and Checkpoints Authority (ICA) is in charge of immigration, Singapore passports, identity cards, Citizen Registration (Birth and Death), permanent residents services, customs, issuing permits to foreigners such as visit passes, visas and student passes. The ICA is also in charge of enforcing immigration and visa laws. It ensures that the movement of people, goods and conveyances through the checkpoints is in accordance with regulations imposed by the Ministry of Home Affairs. It is in charge of birth and death registrations. The organisation was formed on 1 April 2003 with the merger of Singapore Immigration and Registration and the border control functions of the Customs and Excise Department. Under the Immigration Act 1959, an ICA officer has powers of a police officer to enforce the provisions of the Act (under Section 38) and may be armed (under Section 38A).

=== Singapore Customs ===
Singapore Customs was formed in 2003 and is responsible for the collection of customs revenue, the prevention of duty and tax evasion, the issuance of customs licences and permits, the enforcement of trade requirements under the respective Free Trade Agreements (FTAs), and the regulation of trade in strategic goods and strategic goods technology. It operates under the Ministry of Finance. Under Section 112 of the Customs Act 1960, a customs officer has the powers of arrest for offences under the same act. Under Section 6A of the Customs Act 1960 and Section 87 of the Guns, Explosives and Weapons Control Act 2021, a customs officer may be armed.

== Non-governmental agencies ==
=== Auxiliary police forces ===
Auxiliary police forces are private companies with officers who are granted police-like powers and law enforcement authority. They are typically employed for infrastructure security and cash-in-transit protection. They are supervised and licensed by the Singapore Police Force.

Five auxiliary police forces are designated by legislation:

- Aetos Auxiliary Police Force (part of Aetos Security Management)
- Certis CISCO Auxiliary Police Force (part of Certis Group)
- Installations Auxiliary Police Force
- Pulau Bukom Auxiliary Police Force
- SATS Auxiliary Police Force (part of SATS Security Services)

=== Security officers ===
Under section 22 of the Infrastructure Protection Act, security officers have a limited power of arrest.

== Comparison of law enforcement agencies ==
Agency	Founded	Parent ministry	Area of responsibility	Powers of arrest	May be armed
Singapore Police Force	1820	Ministry of Home Affairs	General	Yes	Yes
Singapore Prison Service	1946	Ministry of Home Affairs	Prisons	Yes	Yes
Corrupt Practices Investigation Bureau	1952	Prime Minister's Office	Corruption	Yes	Yes
Internal Security Department	1966	Ministry of Home Affairs	Domestic intelligence	Yes	Yes
Security and Intelligence Division	1966	Ministry of Defence	Foreign intelligence	Yes	Yes
Singapore Armed Forces Military Police Command	1966	Ministry of Defence	Military offences	Partial	Yes
Singapore Civil Defence Force Provost Unit	1982	Ministry of Home Affairs	Service offences	Partial	Yes
Central Narcotics Bureau	1971	Ministry of Home Affairs	Illegal drugs	Yes	Yes
Inland Revenue Authority of Singapore	1992	Ministry of Finance	Tax collection	Partial	Yes
Land Transport Authority	1995	Ministry of Transport	Traffic offences	Partial	No
Ministry of Manpower	1998	Self	Labour offences	Partial	No
Immigration and Checkpoints Authority	2003	Ministry of Home Affairs	Immigration offences	Partial	Yes
Singapore Customs	2003	Ministry of Finance	Customs offences	Partial	Yes
Auxiliary police forces	Varying	Ministry of Home Affairs	Protective security	Yes	Yes
Security officers	Varying	Ministry of Home Affairs	Protective security	Partial	No

== See also ==
- Fast Response Car
- Law of Singapore
- Misuse of Drugs Act (Singapore)
- Neighbourhood police centre
