= Corrupt Practices Investigation Bureau =

Independent agency of the government of Singapore

Corrupt Practices Investigation Bureau Biro Siasatan Amalan Rasuah (Malay) 贪污调查局 (Chinese) லஞ்ச ஊழல் புலனாய்வுப் பிரிவு (Tamil)
- Abbreviation: CPIB

Agency overview
- Formed: 1952; 74 years ago
- Preceding agency: Anti-Corruption Branch of the Singapore Police Force

Jurisdictional structure
- Operations jurisdiction: Singapore
- Constituting instrument: Prevention of Corruption Act
- Specialist jurisdiction: Anti-corruption

Operational structure
- Headquarters: 2 Lengkok Bahru, Singapore 159047
- Elected officer responsible: Lawrence Wong, Prime Minister
- Agency executive: Denis Tang, Director
- Parent agency: Prime Minister's Office

Website
- www.cpib.gov.sg

The Corrupt Practices Investigation Bureau (CPIB) is an independent agency of the Government of Singapore responsible for the investigation and prosecution of any possible serious or complex fraud and corruption in Singapore. The CPIB has the mandate to investigate into any acts or forms of corruption in the public and private sectors in Singapore, and in the course of doing so, any other offences under any written law, with the powers of arrest.

The CPIB has been credited for being one of the main contributors to the transformation of Singapore into one of the least corrupt nations in the world, additionally being the most transparent in the whole of Asia as per indexes such as the Corruption Perceptions Index (CPI).

== History ==
Formerly known as the Anti Corruption Branch (ACB) within the Singapore Police Force (SPF), the CPIB was first established in 1952 as an independent agency under the purview of the attorney-general. Having been under the purview of the Ministry of Home Affairs (MHA) during its earlier years, the agency remained under the purview of the attorney-general until it was transferred to the Prime Minister's Office (PMO) in 1969.

In 1961, the bureau moved into the former Registration Office on Stamford Road, which was itself formerly a middle school building for St Andrew's School. It remained there for 24 years before moving into the Hill Street Centre on 6 August 1984. On 9 March 1998, the CPIB moved into the former Keppel Primary School. In April 2004, it moved to Lengkok Bahru at Bukit Merah.

== Legal framework ==
Enacted on 17 June 1960, the Prevention of Corruption Act (PCA) is the primary anti-corruption law in Singapore. The following are provided for under the PCA:

- Powers for the CPIB to investigate bribery in all forms, both monetary and non-monetary in nature, and in both the public and private sectors;
- Extraterritorial powers for the CPIB to deal with corrupt acts committed by a Singapore citizen outside Singapore as though these were committed in Singapore;
- Fine of up to S$100,000 or an imprisonment term not exceeding 5 years, or to both, for each count of corruption;
- Fine of up to S$100,000 or an imprisonment term not exceeding 7 years, or to both, for each count of corruption in relation to a contract or a proposal for a contract with the Government;
- Presumption where any gratification given or received by a person in the employment of the Government or of a public body is deemed corrupt, and the burden of proof to rebut the presumption lies with the person;
- Forfeiture of gratification received in the form of a penalty equivalent to the amount of bribes received upon conviction; and
- Non-disclosure of the name or address of any informer, or any matter which might lead to the discovery of the informer's identity.

The CPIB also operates with functional independence from the police and nominally from the government, and is headed by a director who reports directly to the Prime Minister but may also additionally report to the President, especially if the former refuses to give consent for a formal investigation or there's a potential case against the Prime Minister themselves.

The agency may also, in the course of its investigations, come across cases which reveal corruption-prone areas or loopholes in procedures in government departments. Based on its findings, CPIB may review the department concerned and recommend changes in their procedures. In addition to its primary function of investigating corruption offences, the CPIB also undertakes public education and community outreach efforts relating to anti-corruption.

The director of the CPIB can also report to the president if the prime minister refuses any investigation or prosecution to be taken place.

== Cases ==
In April 2019, the CPIB reported that it received 358 corruption-related reports, and registered 107 new cases for investigation in 2018. Cases involving the private sector continued to form the majority, or 88%, of all new cases registered for investigation by the CPIB in 2018. The conviction rate remained high, averaging 98% from 2014 to 2018. The CPIB is committed to fight corruption with resolve, by strengthening its interview tradecraft, intelligence and investigative support capabilities.

=== Notable cases ===
Some notable cases tackled by the CPIB are the operation against Chap Ji Kee lottery syndicates, the corruption trial against Minister of State Wee Toon Boon and the investigation of Minister for National Development Teh Cheang Wan. In 2023, the CPIB arrested property tycoon Ong Beng Seng and Minister for Transport S. Iswaran for bribery and corruption respectively.

== See also ==
- Corruption in Singapore
- Law of Singapore
- Law enforcement in Singapore
