= Honesty box =

Unguarded cash container for customers to pay for a good or service

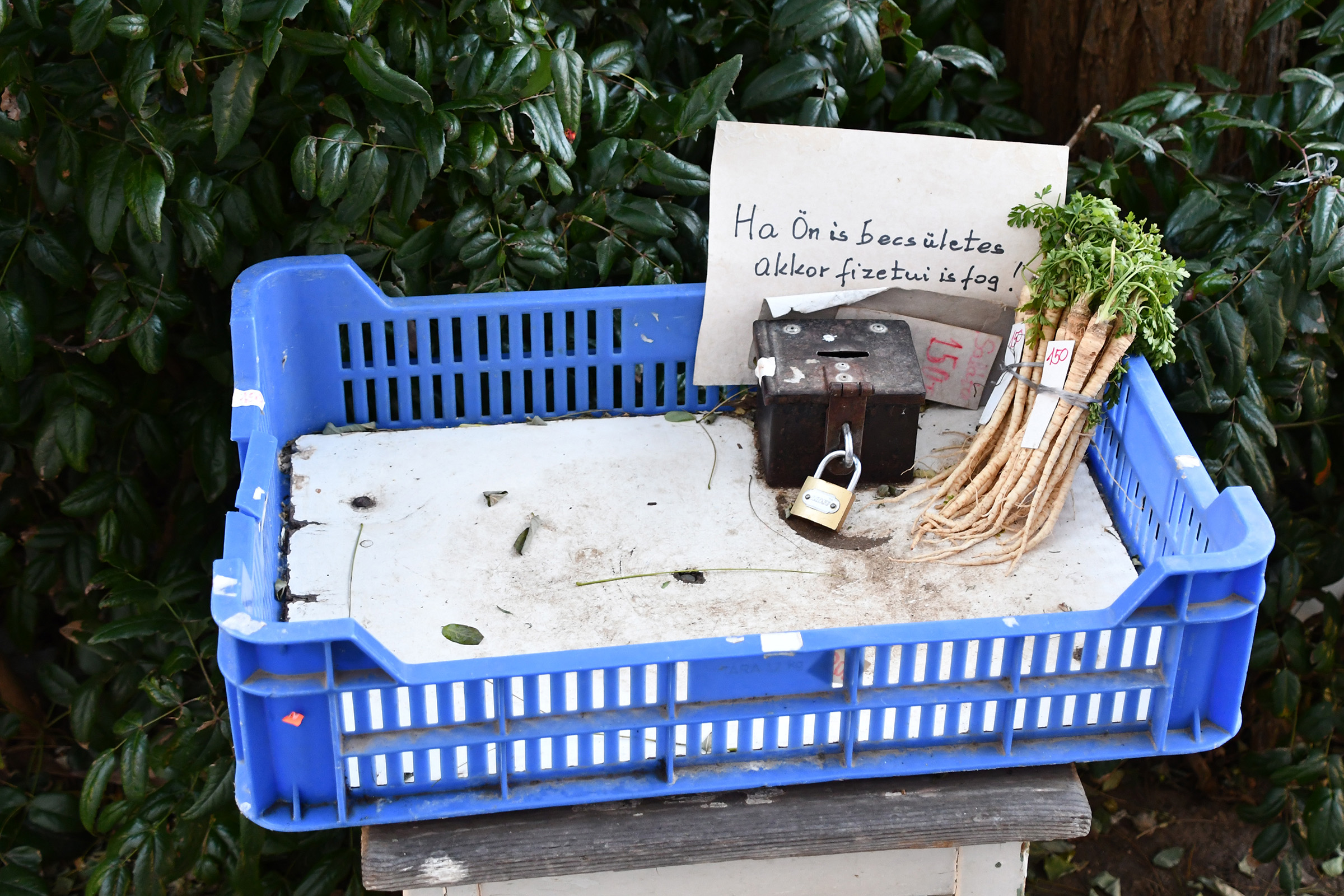
Unattended parsnips left for sale at a roadside in Hungary, with a locked honesty box.

An honesty box, or honour box, is a method of charging for a service such as admission to a facility or car parking, or for a product such as home-grown produce, baked goods and flowers, which relies upon each visitor paying at a box using the honor system. For services or admission, tickets are not issued and such sites are usually unattended.

When used in camping sites and other park settings, they are sometimes referred to as an iron ranger as there is often an iron cash box instead of an actual park ranger. Some stores also use them for selling newspapers to avoid lines at a cash register.

Such boxes are typically used in rural areas where the low number of customers and other visitors, along with the low quantity or value of the products on offer, means that an attendant would not bring a positive return on investment. Many are also domestically run operations where attendance is not feasible.

== Examples ==
The Cake Fridge, an honesty box cake fridge in Bixter, Shetland, Scotland, features in the TV adaptation of Anne Cleeves novels.

== History ==
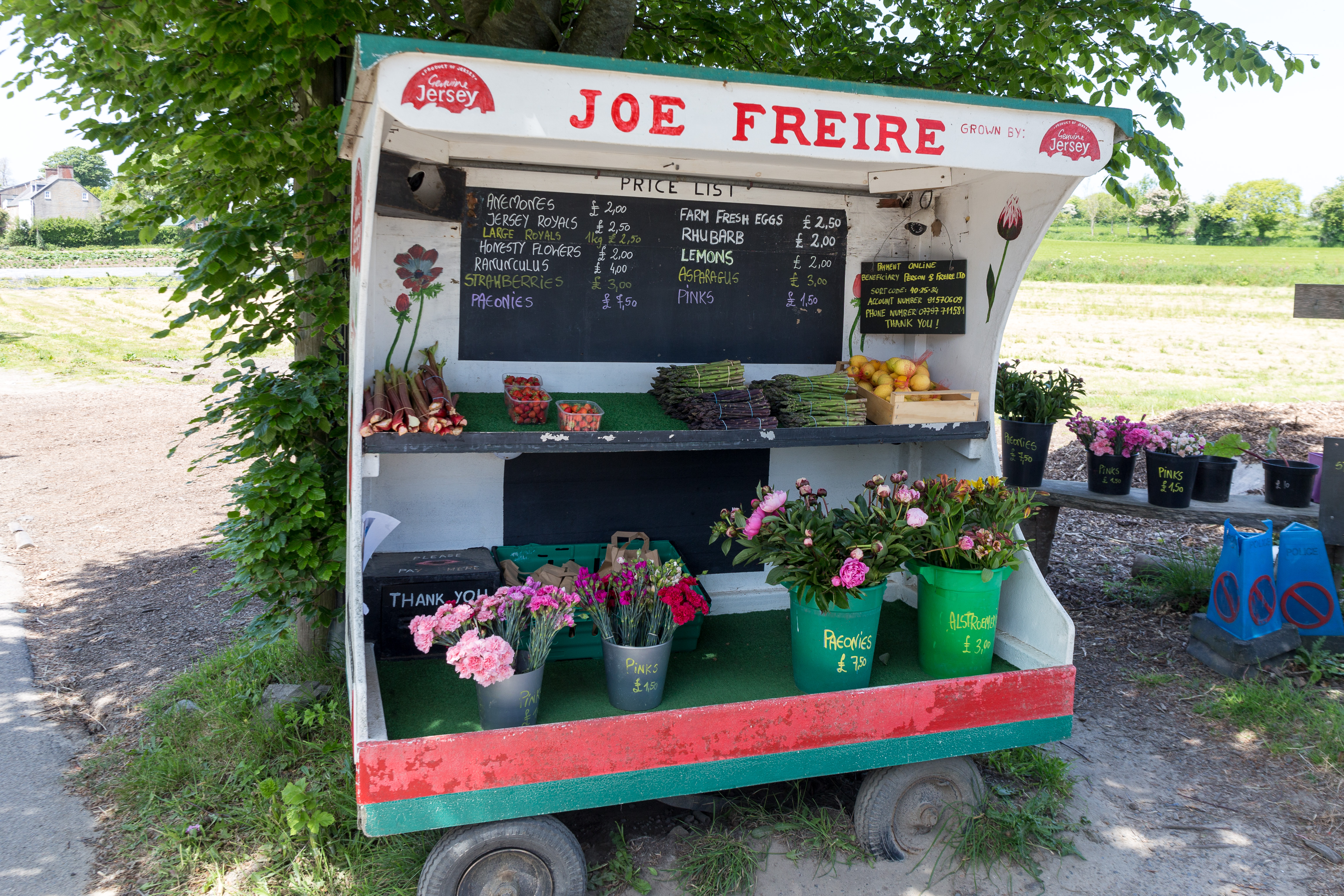
A flower and produce stand in St Lawrence, Jersey with an honesty box.

The use of honesty boxes saw a resurgence in 2020 during the COVID-19 pandemic, because purchases can be made without contact.

== See also ==
- Take a penny, leave a penny
