= John Walsh (Dakota politician) =

American politician

John Walsh was an Irish-born American politician. He was a member of the Legislature of Dakota Territory.

In 1869, he established a homestead five miles east of Elk Point in Union County, Dakota Territory. He was known as "Honest John" and was later elected to the Dakota Territorial Legislature, where he served from 1881 to 1882.
