= Honor system =

Process of governing without enforcement

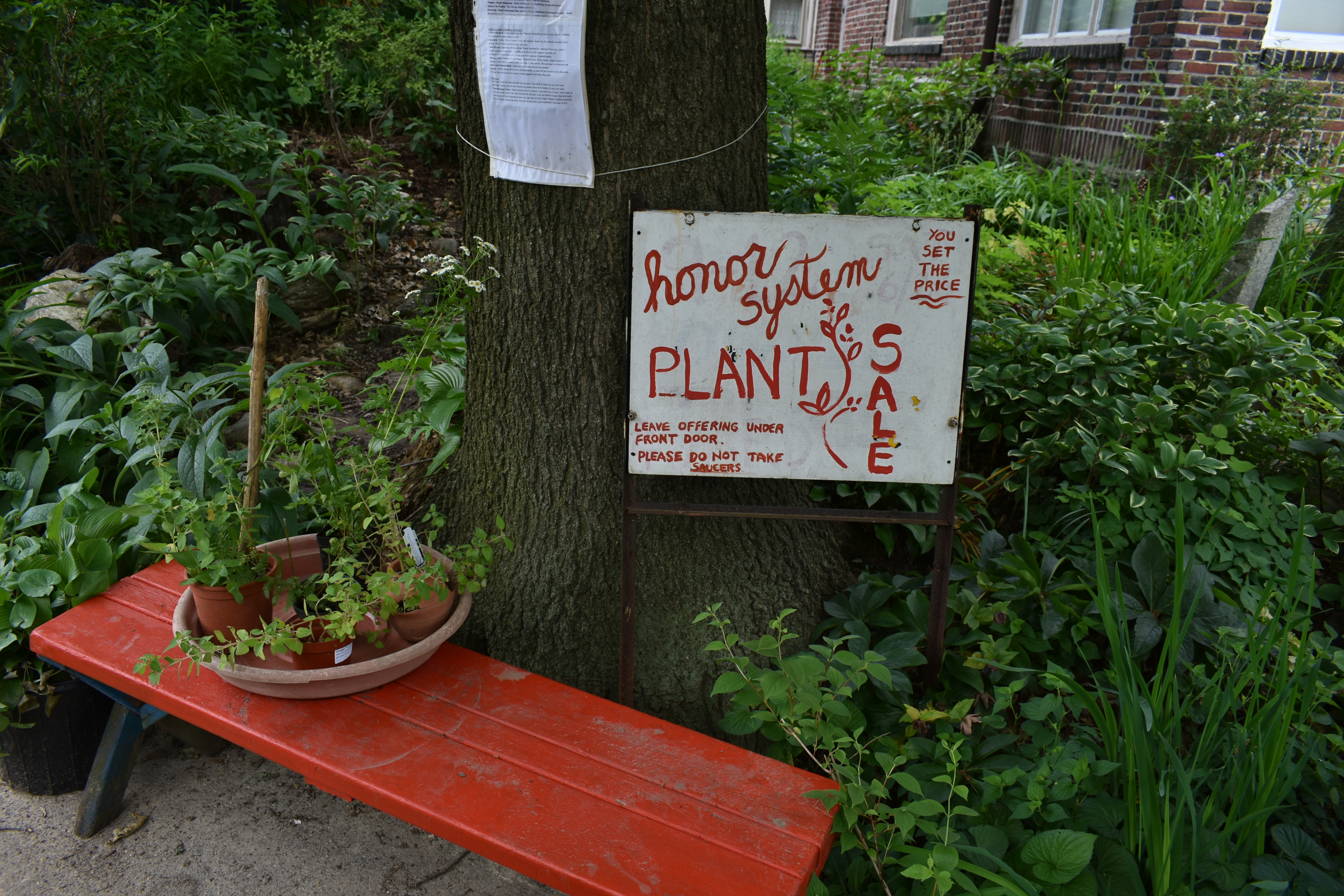
Plants available for sale in Philadelphia using the honor system

An honor system, trust system, or honesty system is a way of running a variety of endeavors based on trust, honor, and honesty.

The honor system is also a system granting freedom from customary surveillance (as to students or prisoners) with the understanding that those who are so freed will be bound by their honor to observe regulations (e.g., prison farms may be operated under the honor system), and will therefore not abuse the trust placed in them.

== Examples ==
=== Education ===
The first honor system in America was created at the College of William & Mary in 1779. In some colleges, the honor system is used to administer tests unsupervised. Students are generally asked to sign an honor code statement that says they will not cheat or use unauthorized resources when taking tests. As an example, at Vanderbilt University, students taking examinations are required to sign and include the following pledge: "I pledge on my honor that I have neither given nor received unauthorized aid on this examination." Any student caught in violation of the Honor Code is referred to the Honor Council, which investigates and determines the appropriate action, which can range from failing the course to expulsion from the university.

At the University of Virginia, a student taking an examination is also required to sign a pledge not to give or receive aid; the single penalty for transgression of the honor code is dismissal from the university. Texas A&M University also has an Honor System, which states: "Aggies do not lie, cheat or steal or tolerate those who do." Any student who does not follow the code is remanded to the Honor Council so they can determine the severity of the case and whether the student should be sanctioned or expelled. The students at the University of North Carolina at Chapel Hill similarly maintain a student-run honor system, pledging not to cheat, steal, or lie. Unlike the University of Virginia, the honor system at Chapel Hill allows for flexible sanctions, ranging from probation to expulsion. A single-sanction Honor Code exists at the Virginia Military Institute, where a "drum out" ceremony is still carried out upon a cadet's dismissal.

Some private universities are run by or associated with religious organizations, and their honor codes reflect that association. At Brigham Young University, students commit to the Church Educational System Honor Code, which, unlike other academic honor codes, includes rules regarding sexual and romantic conduct as well as mandatory attendance at religious services.

Unproctored exams have been found to result in higher rates of undetected cheating compared to proctored exams.

=== Retail ===
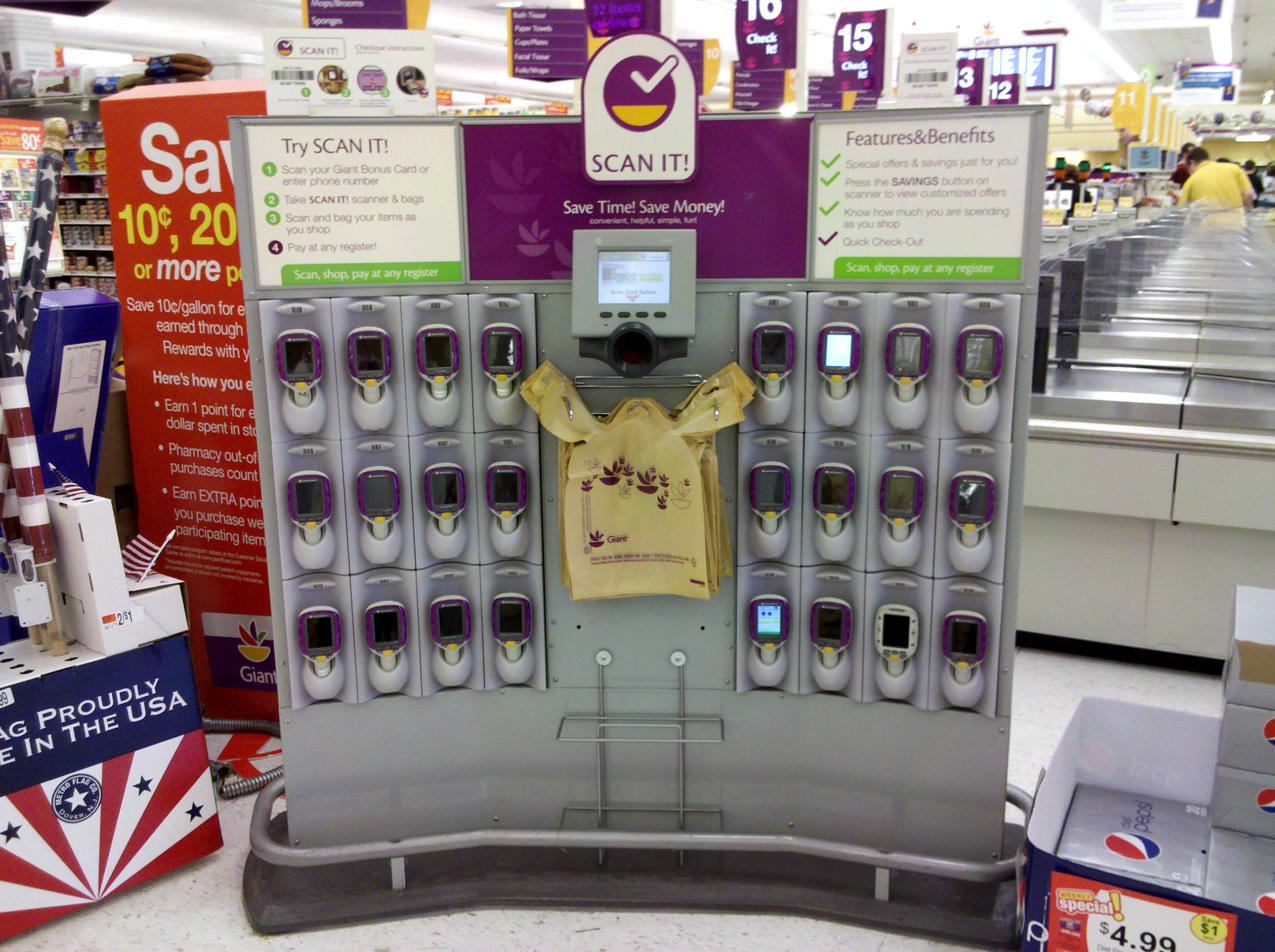
These handheld scanning devices allow customers to scan their own groceries while shopping. Such activity is not closely monitored by employees and operates on an honor system.

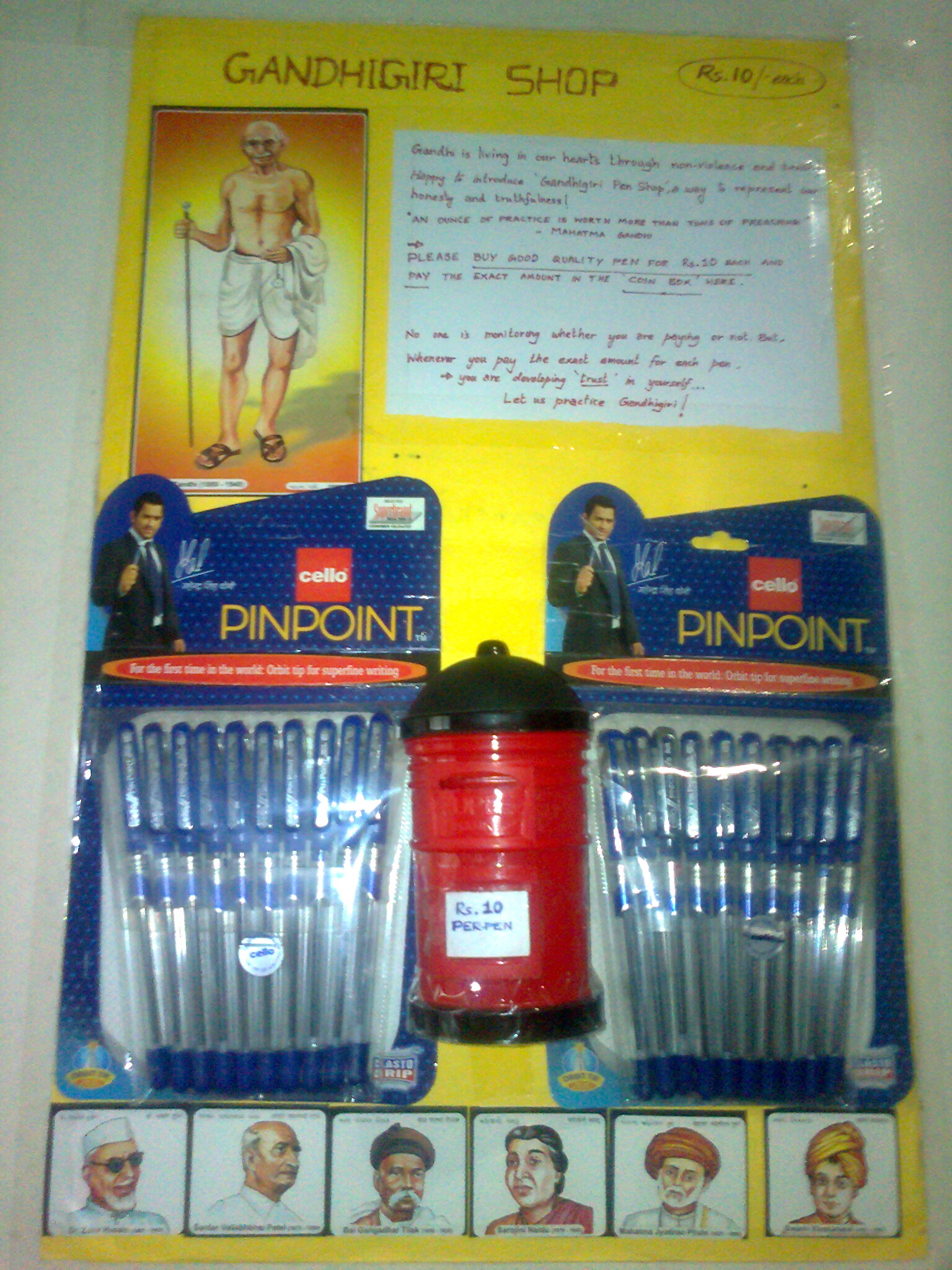
Example of the honor system at an unmanned Gandhigiri Shop in Mumbai, India.

Some supermarket chains allow customers to scan their own groceries with handheld barcode readers while placing them in their carts (see self-checkout). Customers are subject to random audits. While the system allows customers to bag groceries before paying, participating supermarkets report that this experimental system has not increased shoplifting.

In some countries, farmers leave bags of produce beside the road outside their homes with prices affixed. Passers-by pay by placing cash in a container. In Ireland, New Zealand, Australia, and the United Kingdom, this is known as the honesty box system, whereas in the United States, it is called the honor system. In other cases, small unmanned stores operate where customers enter, select what they need, and deposit payment into a secure container.

=== Public health ===
During the COVID-19 pandemic, as populations gained access to vaccines, the Centers for Disease Control and Prevention issued guidance stating that fully vaccinated individuals were no longer required to wear face masks. Many establishments relied on an honor system, trusting unvaccinated individuals to continue wearing masks voluntarily.

=== Public transport ===
Various public transport systems operate without physical turnstiles on an enforced honor system. Ticket validation relies on random inspections by revenue protection inspectors rather than systematic gate checks; passengers found traveling without a valid ticket receive a penalty fare.

== See also ==
- Hawala or hundi, an informal value transfer system based on an honor system
- Kavka's toxin puzzle, examining the paradoxical nature of "rewarding intent"
- Reputation system

== Bibliography ==
- Bowman, James. Honor: A History. Encounter, 2007.
- Wyatt-Brown, Bertram. Southern Honor: Ethics and Behavior in the Old South. OUP, 2007.
