= List of people with surname Zhang =

List of people surnamed Zhang is a list, which records the people who used to be surnamed Zhang.

== Historical figures ==
- Zhang Yi (died 309 BC), strategist in the Warring States period
- Zhang Han (died 205 BC), military general of the Qin dynasty
- Zhang Tang (died 116 BC), official of the Western Han dynasty under Emperor Wu
- Zhang Anshi, son of Zhang Tang, official of the Han dynasty
- Zhang Liang (died 186 BC), adviser to Liu Bang (founding emperor of the Han dynasty).
- Zhang Jue, leader of the Yellow Turban Rebellion in the Eastern Han dynasty
- Zhang Rang (died 189), leader of the eunuch faction during the reign of Emperor Ling in the Eastern Han dynasty
- Zhang Lu (died 216), 3rd Celestial Master of Zhengyi Dao Order and political leader during Eastern Han dynasty
- Zhang Fei (died 221), general of the Shu Han state in the Three Kingdoms period
- Zhang Hong (153–212), official serving under the warlord Sun Quan in the Eastern Han dynasty
- Zhang Yi (died 230), general of the Shu Han state in the Three Kingdoms period
- Empress Zhang (died 237), Empress of the Shu Han state in the Three Kingdoms period
- Zhang He (died 231), general of the Cao Wei state in the Three Kingdoms period
- Zhang Liao (169–222), general of the Cao Wei state in the Three Kingdoms period
- Zhang Zhao (156–238), official of the Eastern Wu state in the Three Kingdoms period
- Zhang Chunhua (died 247), wife of the Cao Wei general Sima Yi in the Three Kingdoms period
- Zhang Ni (died 254), general of the Shu Han state in the Three Kingdoms period
- Zhang Yi (died 264), general of the Shu Han state in the Three Kingdoms period
- Zhang Bu (died 264), general of the Eastern Wu state in the Three Kingdoms period
- Zhang Hua (232–300), Western Jin dynasty official and poet.
- Zhang Mao (277–324), founder of Former Liang in the Sixteen Kingdoms period
- Zhang Ci (died 386), general and eunuch of the Former Qin state in the Sixteen Kingdoms period
- Zhang Liang, general and official of the Tang dynasty
- Zhang Yue (663–730), Tang dynasty chancellor and poet
- Zhang Jiuling (673–740), Tang dynasty chancellor and poet
- Zhang Jun (1086–1154), general of the Song dynasty
- Zhang Jiucheng (1092–1159), court official
- Zhang Hongfan (1238–1280), Yuan dynasty general
- Zhang Sicheng (died 1344), 39th Celestial Master of Zhengyi Dao Order during the Yuan dynasty, known for his calligraphy
- Zhang Juzheng (1525–1582), Ming dynasty statesman

== Science and mathematics ==
- Zhang Heng (78–139), Chinese scientist, mathematician and polymath who invented the first earthquake detector during the Han dynasty
- Yi Xing (683–727, birthname: Zhang Sui), Chinese mathematician, astronomer and mechanical engineer born during the Tang dynasty, calculated the number of possible positions on a go board game
- Zhang Shoucheng (1963–2018), American theoretical physicist
- Zhang Shouwu (born 1962), Chinese-American mathematician
- Zhang Yitang (born 1955), Chinese-American mathematician
- Zhang Jie, Chinese physicist
- Liangchi Zhang (born 1958), Chinese Australian mechanical engineer and scientist
- John Zhang (born 1958), medical scientist in fertility research, and in vitro fertilization. Produced the world's first three-parent baby using the spindle transfer technique in 2016
- Feng Zhang (born 1982), neuroscientist and biomedical engineer in optogenetics and CRISPR technologies
- Guoqi Zhang speciality in electronics
- Huaguang Zhang speciality in electronics
- Jianzhong Zhang speciality in electronics
- Junshan Zhang speciality in electronics
- Wen-Hao Zhang plant physiologist and nutritionist
- Wenjun Zhang speciality in electronics
- Zhijun Zhang speciality in electronics

== Government and military ==
- Cheong Weng Chon (born 1966), Macau administrator
- Zhang Aiping (1908–2003), Chinese communist military leader
- Zhang Boxing (1930–2025), Chinese politician
- Zhang Chunqiao (1917–2005), member of the Gang of Four
- Zhang Dingfan (1891–1945), Chinese general
- Zhang Guohua (1914–1972), PLA general in the Battle of Chamdo and the Sino-Indian War
- Zhang Shicheng (1321–1367), Red Turban Rebellion leader
- Zhang Tiesheng Communist politician
- Zhang Tingyu (1672–1755), Qing dynasty politician
- Zhang Wentian (1900–1976), former General Secretary of the Chinese Communist Party
- Zhang Xueliang (1901–2001), Manchurian warlord and Zhang Zuolin's son
- Zhang Zhen (1914–2015), Chinese communist military leader and Vice Chairman of the Central Military Commission
- Zhang Zhidong (1837–1909), Qing dynasty politician
- Zhang Zizhong (1891–1940), NRA general
- Zhang Zongchang (1881–1932), Shandong warlord
- Zhang Zuolin (1873–1928), Manchurian warlord
- Zhang Guangming (1913–2016), General, RoCAF, ace fighter pilot-veteran of the War of Resistance/WWII
- Zhang Jihui (1927–2023), Chinese fighter pilot
- Zhang Dejiang (born 1946), former Chairman of the Standing Committee of the National People's Congress
- Zhang Gaoli (born 1946), former Vice Premier of the People's Republic of China
- Zhang Youxia (born 1950), Vice Chairman of the Central Military Commission
- Zhang Guoqing (born 1964), Vice Premier of the People's Republic of China

== Entertainment ==
- Chang Cheh, Chinese film director.
- Chang Chia-hang, Taiwanese online personality
- Zhang Yimou (born 1951), Chinese film director and former cinematographer
- Zhang Guoli (born 1955), Chinese actor and film director
- Zhang Yuan (born 1963), Chinese film director
- Zhang Hanyu (born 1964), Chinese actor
- Zhang Yang (born 1967), Chinese film director, screenwriter, and occasional actor
- Jason Zhang (born 1982), Chinese pop singer
- Jane Zhang (born 1984), Chinese pop singer
- Zhang Zhenhuan (born 1984), Chinese actor and MediaCorp artiste based in Singapore
- Zhang Xianzi (born 1986), Chinese singer
- Zhang Yu (born 1988), Chinese voice actress
- Zhang Yunlong (born 1988), Chinese actor
- Baby Zhang (Zhang Hanyun) (born 1989), Chinese singer and runner-up of the singing contest Super Girl
- Zhang Liyin (born 1989), Chinese singer active in China and South Korea
- Zhang Haochen (born 1990), Chinese pianist
- Zhang Yuxi (born 1991), Chinese actress
- Zhang Zhehan (born 1991), Chinese actor
- Lay Zhang (born 1991), Chinese singer, dancer and songwriter, member of the South Korean group Exo
- Zhang Xincheng (born 1995), Chinese actor, model, singer.
- Chelsea Zhang (born 1996), American actress
- Zhang Yuge (born 1996), Chinese idol singer and member of female idol group SNH48
- Zhang Zining (born 1996), Chinese singer, member of girl groups MERA and Rocket Girls 101
- Zhang Linghe (born 1997), Chinese actor
- Zhang Zhenyuan (born 2003), Chinese singer, member of Teens in Times

== Writers ==
- Zhang Chao (1600–?), Qing dynasty literature and fiction writer
- Zhang Chengzhi (born 1948), Hui Muslim writer and author of History of the Soul
- Zhang Dai (1597–1689), Ming dynasty writer and historian
- Zhang Lijia (born 1964), Chinese writer and author of "Socialism is Great!"
- Zhang Tianyi (1906–1985), Chinese left-wing writer and children's author
- Zhang Hongliang (born 1955), Chinese Maoist writer, scholar and social commentator
- Zhang Jialong (born 1988), Chinese journalist
- Zhang Renxi, 17th century Chinese poetical critic
- Lifen Zhang (born 1962), British-Chinese journalist, author and broadcaster
- Zhang Xinxin (writer) (born 1953), Chinese writer
- Zhang Yousong (1903–1995), Chinese translator
- Zhang Zhu (1287–1386), Chinese poet
- Zhang Zao (1962–2010), Chinese poet

== Sports ==
- Zhang Bing (born 1969), Chinese sports shooter
- Caroline Zhang (born 1993), American figure skater
- Zhang Dan (born 1985), Chinese pair skater, Zhang Hao's partner
- Zhang Hao (born 1984), Chinese pair skater, Zhang Dan's partner
- Zhang Hong Wei, Chinese paralympic athlete
- Zhang Huimin (born 1999), Chinese female athlete
- Zhang Jin (bobsledder) (born 2003), Chinese bobsledder
- Zhang Jin (gymnast) (born 2000), Chinese artistic gymnast
- Zhang Juanjuan (born 1981), Chinese archer
- Zhang Jun (born 1977), Chinese badminton coach and former badminton player
- Zhang Lianbiao (born 1969), Chinese retired javelin thrower
- Zhang Lijun (born 1996), Chinese female curler
- Zhang Ning (born 1975), Chinese badminton player
- Rose Zhang, American golfer
- Zhang Guowei (high jumper), Chinese high jumper
- Zhang Shan Qi (born 1991), Chinese racecar driver
- Zhang Shuai (born 1989), Chinese tennis player
- Zhang Shuxian (born 2000), Chinese badminton player
- Zhang Tianjie (born 1992), a naturalized Japanese basketball player who later changed his name to Tenketsu Harimoto
- Zhang Tiequan (born 1978), Chinese martial artist
- Zhang Weili (born 1989), Chinese mixed martial artist
- Zhang Xi (born 1985), Chinese beach volleyball player
- Zhang Xufei (born 1984), Chinese sitting volleyball player
- Zhang Yining (born 1981), Chinese table tennis player
- Zhang Lin (born 1987), competitive swimmer, world record holder
- Zhang Yufei (born 1998), competitive swimmer
- Zhang Yufei (born 1988), gymnast and gymnastics coach
- Zhang Yuning (born 1976), Chinese footballer
- Zhang Jike (born 1989), Chinese table tennis player

== Others ==
- Zhang Baokang or Sheng-yen (1930–2009), Chinese Buddhist monk and religious scholar, founder of the "Dharma Drum Mountain"
- Zhang Daoling or Zhang Tianshi (34–156), First Celestial Master and founder of the Taoist Order known as "Tian Shi Dao" or "Zhengyi Dao"
- Zhang Daqian (1899–1983) Chinese artist
- Zhang Guoxiang, 50th Celestial Master of Zhengyi Dao Order
- Zhang Hongbao (1954–2006), founder and spiritual leader of Zhong Gong
- Zhang Huaxiang, Chinese nurse murdered in Singapore
- Linda Zhang, American automotive engineer
- Zhang Luqin or Master Yin Shun (1906–2005), well-known Buddhist monk and scholar who bring forth Humanistic Buddhism
- Zhang Mingxuan Chinese clergyman and president of the Chinese House Church Alliance
- Zhang Qian (200–114 BC), Han dynasty diplomat and explorer
- Zhang Qiulin (born 1964), Chinese French contralto opera singer
- Zhang Sanfeng, semi-mythical Taoist sage in the Yuan and Ming dynasties
- Zhang Xiao (born 1981), Chinese photographer
- Zhang Yufeng (born 1945), former personal secretary of Mao Zedong
- Zhang Zeduan (1085–1145), Chinese painter
- Zhang Zhan (born 1983), Chinese lawyer and citizen journalist
- Zhang Zhongjing, (150–219), Han dynasty physician
- Zhang Zilin (born 1984), winner of Miss World 2007
- James X. Zhang, American health economist and academic
- Xinyu Zhang (born 1955), Chinese businessman
- Zhang Meng, Chinese murder victim killed in Singapore
- Zhang Yingying, Chinese exchange student who was kidnapped and murdered in the United States

== Fictional and mythological characters ==
- Frank Zhang, Roman demigod sired by Mars in The Heroes of Olympus series by Rick Riordan
- Elder Zhang Guo (Zhang Guolao), one of the Eight Immortals in Chinese mythology
- Zhang Taiyan, grandmaster of Hokuto Sōkaken in the manga and anime series Fist of the Blue Sky
- Zhang Wuji, the protagonist of the wuxia novel The Heaven Sword and Dragon Saber by Jin Yong (Louis Cha)

== Chang ==
- Angela Chang, Taiwanese singer and actress
- Chang Cheh, Hong Kong film director
- Chang Chen-yue or "A-Yue", Taiwanese rock musician
- Chang Ching-sen (born 1959), Governor of Fujian Province
- Chang Chun-hsiung (1938–2025), Taiwanese politician and lawyer
- Chang Fei or "Fei Ge", Taiwanese television personality
- Chang Jin-fu (born 1948), Governor of Taiwan (Republic of China province) (2009–2010)
- Chang King-yuh (born 1937), Minister of Mainland Affairs Council of the Republic of China (1996–1999)
- Chang Liang-jen (born 1946), Deputy Minister of National Defense of the Republic of China (2008–2009)
- Chang Li-shan (born 1964), Magistrate-elect of Yunlin County
- Chang San-cheng (born 1954), Premier of Taiwan (2016)
- Chang Tzi-chin, Deputy Magistrate of Taipei County (2005–2006)
- Chen Chung Chang (1927–2014), mathematician
- Deserts Chang, Taiwanese singer/songwriter
- Feiping Chang, Taiwanese-born Hong Kong socialite and fashion blogger
- Edmond E-min Chang (born 1970), Taiwanese American former lawyer and current federal district judge for northern Illinois, appointed by President Obama in 2010
- Eileen Chang (1920–1995), Chinese writer
- Erchen Chang, Taiwanese chef
- Eva Fong Chang (1897–1991), American artist
- Chang Hui-mei or "A-mei", aboriginal Taiwanese singer and occasional songwriter.
- Iris Chang (1968–2004), American historian and journalist
- Jeff Chang, Taiwanese singer
- Jung Chang, Chinese writer and author of Wild Swans
- Chang Kai-chen (born 1991), Taiwanese tennis player
- Kathleen Chang, birth name of Kathy Change, a political activist who committed suicide by self-immolation at the University of Pennsylvania in 1996
- Katharine Chang, Chairperson of Straits Exchange Foundation
- Chang King Hai Chinese international footballer in 1948 Olympics
- Li Fung Chang, Taiwanese communications engineer
- Michael Te-Pei Chang (born 1972), Chinese American tennis player
- Peng Chun Chang (1892–1957), Chinese professor, philosopher, and playwright who played a pivotal role in drafting the Universal Declaration of Human Rights
- Phil Chang, Taiwanese singer-songwriter and television personality
- Shi-Kuo Chang, Taiwanese computer scientist and science fiction author
- Tseng Chang (1930–2021), Chinese American actor
- Victor Chang (1936–1991), Chinese-Australian cardiac surgeon
- Chang Yu-sheng (1966–1997), Taiwanese singer, composer, and producer

== Cheong ==
- Cheong Chun Yin (张俊炎; born 1984), Malaysian drug trafficker and life convict in Singapore
- Cheong Fatt Tze (1840–1916), Chinese businessman and politician
- Cheong Yoke Choy (1873–1958), Chinese-Malaysian philanthropist
- Cheong Choong Kong (born 1941), Malaysian businessman, former CEO of Singapore Airlines
- Cheong Liew (born 1949), Malaysian-Australian chef
- Cheong Kuoc Vá (born 1956), Macau politician
- Cheong Koon Hean (born 1957), Singaporean urban planner and architect
- Cheong U (born 1957), Macau politician
- Cheong Chia Chieh (born c. 1972), Malaysian businessman
- Cheong Jun Hoong (born 1990), Malaysian diver

== Cheung ==
- Andrew Cheung (born 1961), Hong Kong judge and jurist
- Cecilia Cheung (born 1980), Hong Kong actress and singer
- Cheung Chi Doy (born 1941), Hong Kong-born footballer who represented Republic of China (Taiwan)
- Cheung Chi Wai (born 1946), Hong Kong-born footballer who represented Republic of China (Taiwan)
- Dicky Cheung (born 1965), Hong Kong actor and singer
- Jacky Cheung (born 1961), Hong Kong actor and singer
- Karin Anna Cheung (born 1974), American actress, singer, and songwriter
- Leslie Cheung (1956–2003), Hong Kong actor and musician
- Louis Cheung (born 1980), Hong Kong actor, singer, and songwriter
- Maggie Cheung (born 1964), Hong Kong-British actress
- Margaret Chung (1889–1959), American physician
- Rachel Cheung (born 1991), Hong Kong classical pianist
- Sharla Cheung or Cheung Man (born 1967), Hong Kong actress
- Steven Ng-Sheong Cheung (born 1935), Chinese economist
- Cheung Tat-ming (born 1964), Hong Kong actor, comedian, director, and writer
- Teresa Cheung (born 1959), Hong Kong singer
- Cheung Ka Long (born 1997), Fencing

== Teo ==
- Teo Chee Hean (张志贤; born 1954), Singaporean politician, Senior Minister
- Teo Cheng Kiat (张振杰; born 1953), Singaporean white-collar criminal
- Josephine Teo Li Min (杨莉明; born 1968), Singaporean politician, Minister for Communications and Information
- Nicholas Teo (Chinese: 張棟樑; born 1981), Malaysian Chinese singer based in Taiwan
- Teo Nie Ching (張念群; born 1981), Malaysian politician, Deputy Minister of Education (2018–2020)
- Teo Ser Luck (张思乐; born 1968) Singaporean politician, Mayor of North East District (2009–2017)
- Felicia Teo Wei Ling (张玮凌; 1988–2007), Singaporean student who was presumed missing in 2007 before she was revealed to be murdered
- Teo Ghim Heng (张锦兴; born 1976), Singaporean convicted killer who killed his pregnant wife and daughter
- Teo Zi Ning (张芷宁; 2013–2017), Singaporean murder victim who was killed by her father Teo Ghim Heng
- Winnifred Teo Suan Lie (张碹丽 Zhāng Xuànlì; 1967–1985), Singaporean student and victim of an unsolved rape and murder case

== Tiong ==
- Tiong Hiew King (born 1935), Chinese Malaysian businessman
- Tiong King Sing (born 1961), Chinese Malaysian politician

== Tjong ==
- Tjong A Fie or Tjong Yiauw Hian (1860–1921), Indonesian businessman, philanthropist, banker and Chinese Kapitan of Medan

== 仉 ==
- Mother of Mencius
