= Two Airlines Incident =

1949 Chinese Civil War incident

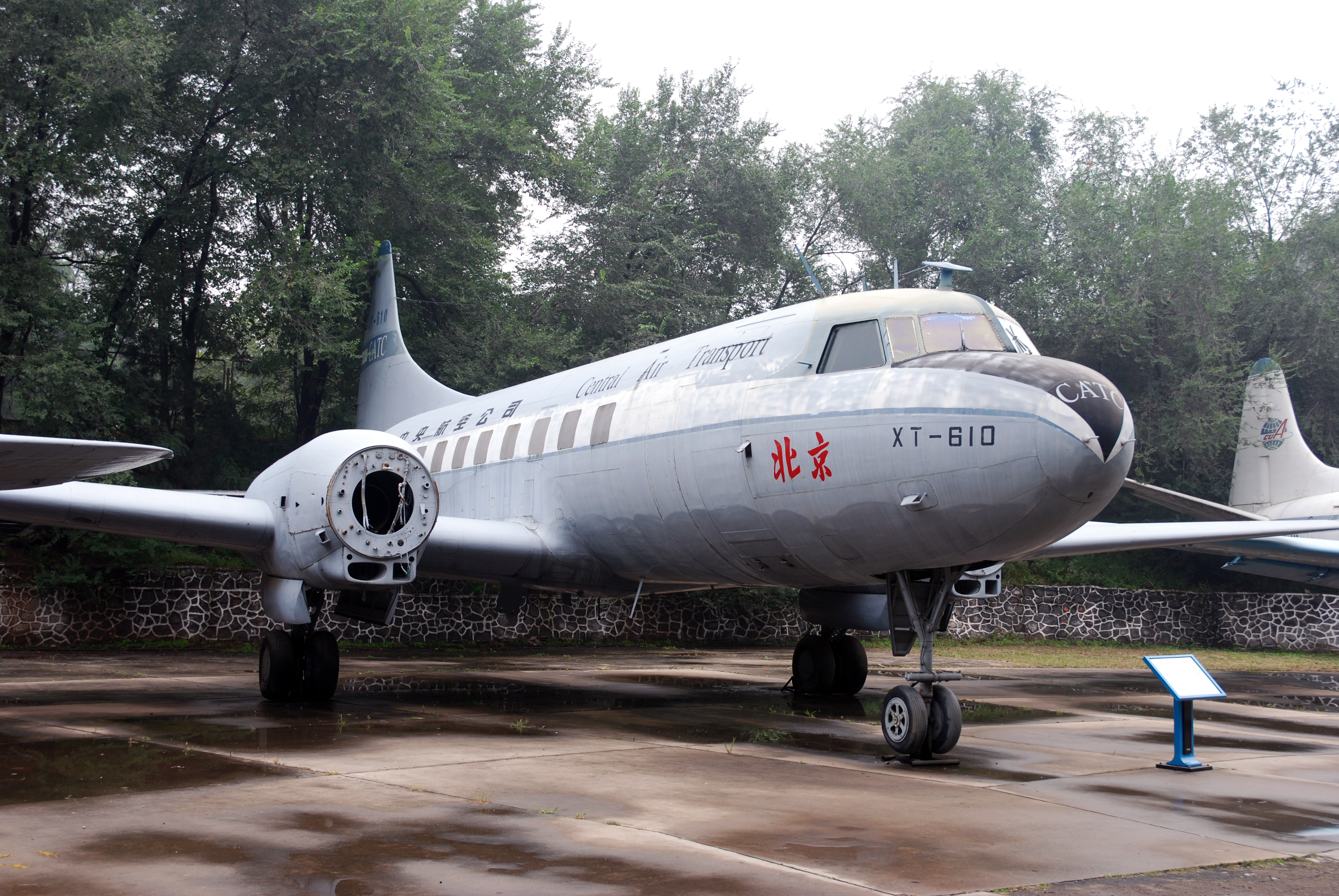
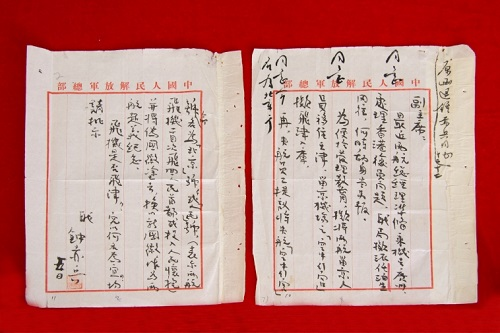
The XT-610 was the only Convair 240 aircraft known to have flown to mainland China during that period. It is now preserved and on display at the China Aviation Museum.

The Two Airlines Incident (referred to in Taiwan as the "Two Airlines Defection" and in mainland China as the "Two Airlines Uprising") occurred during the late stage of the Chinese Civil War. On November 9, 1949, employees of the China National Aviation Corporation (CNAC), under the Republic of China Ministry of Transportation and Communications, and the Central Air Transport (CAT) announced an uprising in British Hong Kong. Led by CNAC General Manager Liu Jing-yi and CAT General Manager Chen Zhuo-lin, they piloted 12 aircraft under difficult conditions—without ground navigation or meteorological support and facing the risk of enemy attacks—to fly to Tianjin and Beijing in the People's Republic of China.Meanwhile, employees remaining in Hong Kong engaged in a "property protection struggle" with the Kuomintang authorities and the British colonial government, safeguarding assets including 71 aircraft, warehouses, and equipment. They also transferred an aircraft repair factory, a telecommunications repair facility, and thousands of tons of equipment, supplies, and aviation fuel back to the mainland.The 71 aircraft stationed at Hong Kong International Airport sparked a dispute between both sides of the Taiwan Strait. The Republic of China government sold these aircraft to the Civil Air Transport company established by Claire Lee Chennault in the United States. After diplomatic and legal struggles involving the Kuomintang, the Chinese Communist Party, the United States, and the United Kingdom, the Hong Kong Supreme Court ruled in favor of Civil Air Transport on October 8, 1952, granting the company ownership of the aircraft.In 1987, the People's Republic of China and the United Kingdom reached an agreement to settle four historical asset claims related to former CNAC and CAT properties. In exchange, the UK government agreed to pay the PRC government $3.8 million.

== Background ==
Before the end of World War II, the Republic of China Ministry of Transportation and Communications operated two major airlines: the China National Aviation Corporation (CNAC) and the Central Air Transport (CAT). In 1946, Claire Lee Chennault and established a privately funded civil air transport company. During the later stages of the Chinese Civil War, government agencies under the Republic of China began relocating to Taiwan. Starting from April 1949, approximately 80 aircraft, maintenance equipment, and logistics personnel from CNAC and CAT were gradually moved from Shanghai to Hong Kong. The Hong Kong government requested the two airlines to withdraw their aircraft from Kai Tak Airport, but this request was refused.

In February 1949, Pan Hannian and Xia Yan, senior officials of the Chinese Communist Party (CCP) Hong Kong Branch, together with Zhang Junxiang, Cai Jingchao, and Yu Lian from the CCP’s Cultural Work Committee stationed in Hong Kong, established contact with He Fengyuan, a CCP member who was then the director of the CNAC (China National Aviation Corporation) Hong Kong office. Through him, they connected with CNAC general manager Liu Jingyi to discuss an uprising under the leadership of the CCP. Around the same time, Chen Zhuolin and Deng Shizhang also decided to leave Hong Kong and reached out to Lei Zhongren, a CAT (Central Air Transport) representative stationed in Nanjing, who in turn communicated with CCP authorities in Beiping (now Beijing).

After the collapse of the peace negotiations between the CCP and the Kuomintang (KMT), in July 1949, the People’s Revolutionary Military Commission of the People’s Republic of China assigned Lü Ming and then-CAT deputy general manager Zha Yiping to go to Hong Kong to plan the defection. They arrived in Hong Kong on August 24 and, through contact with Zhang Tiesheng, Liao Zihui, and others, expanded the plan from persuading pilots to rebel to mobilizing all personnel of both CNAC and CAT to accept leadership from the newly founded People's Republic of China. The plan ultimately succeeded.

== Defection process ==
On the morning of November 9, 1949, the general managers of the two airlines, Liu Jingyi of China National Aviation Corporation (CNAC) and Chen Zhuolin of Central Air Transport (CAT), directed a total of 12 aircraft — including one Convair CV-240 airliner, three C-46 transport aircraft, and eight C-47 transport aircraft — to depart from Kai Tak Airport in British Hong Kong and "fly north" to territories controlled by the newly established People's Republic of China.One of the aircraft, a CAT Convair 240 registered XT-610, landed at Xijiao Airport in Beijing, where it was received by senior officials including Li Kenong, then Vice Minister of Foreign Affairs, and Liu Yalou, commander of the PLAAF.The remaining 11 aircraft landed at Zhangguizhuang Airport in Tianjin. At the same time, more than 2,000 employees from CNAC and CAT offices in Hong Kong and overseas declared their allegiance to the People's Republic of China and gradually returned to the mainland to resume service.

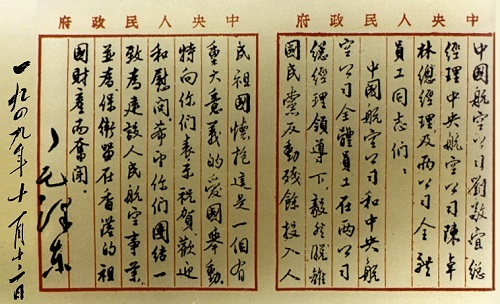
The original telegram from then Chairman of the Central People's Government Mao Zedong congratulating the "Two Airlines" uprising

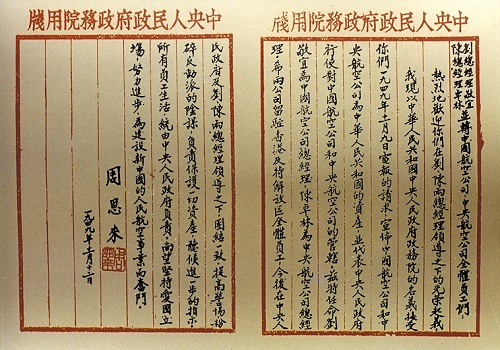
Original letter from Zhou Enlai, then Premier of the State Council of the Central People's Government, congratulating the "Two Airlines" uprising

On November 12, 1949, Premier Zhou Enlai of the State Council of the Central People's Government announced that the China National Aviation Corporation and Central Air Transport Corporation would be taken over as assets of the People's Republic of China.

After the defection incident, the Republic of China government urgently appointed Dai Anguo to take over as the general manager of China Airlines on November 13 to handle the aftermath. Minister of Transportation Ye Gongchao also notified the Hong Kong government to suspend the registration of the two airlines and the crew licenses.

At that time, the two airlines still had 71 aircraft left in Hong Kong. Among these, 40 aircraft belonged to Central Airlines, including 5 Convair 240 passenger aircraft, 18 C-46 transport aircraft, and 17 C-47 transport aircraft; 31 aircraft belonged to China Airlines, including 5 Douglas DC-4 passenger aircraft, 18 C-46 transport aircraft, 7 C-47 transport aircraft, and 1 AT-6 trainer aircraft.

To prevent the remaining aircraft from being handed over by the British to the People's Republic of China for potential use in cross-strait airborne attacks on Taiwan or as tools for expansion in Asia, the Republic of China decided to transfer ownership of the aircraft to American companies. Chennault and Weihall then registered the Civil Air Transport Corporation (CATC, later known as CATi) in Delaware, United States.

On December 12, 1949, the Republic of China government sold the assets of the two airlines from Chennault to CATi. Since Pan Am owned 20% of China Airlines and the registration of aircraft required clear ownership, Pan Am was reluctant but, at the suggestion of the U.S. State Department, sold its shares to CATi for US$1.25 million on December 20, 1949. A few hours later, the aircraft were registered in the United States. CATi then filed a lawsuit in Hong Kong in January 1950, demanding the seizure of the aircraft and their return to CATi. The lawsuit raised several issues under international law. Since the transaction took place before the United Kingdom recognized the People's Republic of China, but the lawsuit occurred after the UK recognized the PRC as the de facto and de jure government of China (on 6 January 1950), the legal question of whether recognition could retroactively invalidate the transaction became a matter of dispute. Civil Air Transport found itself in a politically disadvantageous position, as Hong Kong at the time adopted a friendly attitude toward the PRC government, and the UK was also seeking to secure its interests in China through a degree of diplomatic compromise.

On 23 February 1950, Sir Percy McElwaine, the Chief Justice of the Supreme Court of Hong Kong, ruled that, under the principle of sovereign immunity, the court would not issue a judgment in favor of Civil Air Transport. The following day, U.S. Secretary of State Dean Acheson expressed strong protest at a press conference, stating that the United States had lodged serious objections with both the Hong Kong and British authorities. Influential Republican senators condemned the British action in the United States Senate, arguing that handing over the aircraft to Beijing was the most significant blow by Britain to the non-communist world, and that the United States must make it clear to Britain that if it assists communist expansion in Asia, it cannot expect U.S. support in containing communism in Europe.In response, a spokesperson for the British Foreign Office stated on 27 February that the British government would not interfere with the decision of the Hong Kong courts. On the same day, the People's Republic of China government presented the Hong Kong Government with the registration documents for the aircraft in Beijing.On 6 January 1950, after the United Kingdom formally recognized the People's Republic of China (PRC), Britain expressed interest in exchanging ambassadors and establishing full diplomatic relations. In March, the PRC responded that before sending an ambassador, it wished to clarify the UK's stance on two issues: the Chinese seat at the United Nations, and the ownership of the remaining aircraft. The British government replied that it would vote in favor of seating the PRC in the United Nations Security Council if a majority supported it, and that if no other party claimed ownership of the aircraft, Britain would hand them over to China. The PRC demanded further clarification. After the UK replied in May 1950, the PRC did not respond further.

In March, some aircraft parts and equipment were shipped by sea to mainland China. On 2 April 1950, a ROC agent, Song Xiangyun, planted time bombs at Kai Tak Airport, damaging seven aircraft. On 4 April, Zhou Enlai, the PRC’s foreign minister, accused Britain of obstructing the departure of the planes and held the Government of Hong Kong directly responsible for the damage to Chinese property.

On 10 May 1950, the British government issued an Order in Council, directing the Supreme Court of Hong Kong on how to adjudicate the aircraft ownership dispute: sovereign immunity was not to be considered; the court was to determine and resolve ownership based on the evidence; ex parte trials were permissible; appeals could be made to a full bench of the court (then known as the Court of Appeal) and to the Judicial Committee of the Privy Council; and the Governor of Hong Kong was to prevent the aircraft from leaving the territory until legal proceedings were fully resolved. This indicated that litigation over ownership could potentially last for several years.

On September 28, 1952, the United States Navy dispatched the transport aircraft carrier *Cape Esprance* to Hong Kong to return the first batch of 40 Central Airlines aircraft to Los Angeles. The Republic of China government demanded that Civil Air Transport (CAT) pay US$4 million for these two batches of aircraft and reorganize into a Chinese company. The Central Intelligence Agency originally planned to use these aircraft to support its covert operations but canceled after evaluation. CAT decided to sell part of these aircraft.

On June 5, 1987, the governments of the People's Republic of China and the United Kingdom signed the *Sino-British Agreement on the Settlement of Mutual Claims to Historical Assets*. The agreement stipulated that the Chinese government would no longer pursue claims on the assets of the former China Airlines and Central Airlines, among four other historical claims. In exchange, the British government agreed to pay US$3.8 million to the Chinese government.

== Impact ==
On November 10, 1980, the Party Committee of the Civil Aviation Administration of China pointed out in its "Request Report on the Implementation of the Policy for the Personnel of the Two Airlines Uprising":

(The Two Airlines Uprising) played a supporting role in the War of Liberation and was a leader and model for the uprisings of other Kuomintang organizations in Hong Kong and Kowloon. Chairman Mao and Premier Zhou once sent telegrams to congratulate the success of the uprising and fully affirmed the achievements of the Two Airlines Uprising. Premier Zhou pointed out: "This is the starting point of the Chinese people's aviation industry with unlimited prospects."

On July 29, 1950, the government of the People's Republic of China officially named the primary aircraft involved in the Two Airlines Incident, the Convair CV-240 with the registration XT-610, as the "Beijing". Chairman Mao Zedong personally inscribed the characters "Beijing" (北京) on the aircraft, and a grand naming ceremony was held. The aircraft began operating flights on the Guangzhou–Hankou–Tianjin route starting August 1, with Pan Guoding serving as the captain.

In November 1964, Liu Jingyi was elected as a member of the 4th National Committee of the Chinese People's Political Consultative Conference. In 1971, Liu and his family relocated to Australia. On May 10, 1973, Liu Jingyi, after making arrangements to visit the People's Republic of China, died in Sydney, Australia just before his departure. Premier Zhou Enlai sent a condolence telegram to his family, praising Liu's "patriotic and anti-imperialist spirit [which] will live forever."

After the Two Airlines Incident, personnel who aligned with the People's Republic of China were treated preferentially by civil aviation authorities, with more than half receiving promotions. For couples separated by their assignments, arrangements were made to resolve household registration and employment issues for the other party. On October 22, 1959, Premier Zhou Enlai approved the issuance of commemorative medals to those involved in the uprising. On November 9, 1959, a "10th Anniversary Commemoration of the Two Airlines Uprising" was held at the National Committee Hall in Beijing.

However, during the Anti-Rightist Movement and the Cultural Revolution, many participants of the Two Airlines Incident were persecuted. According to a 1980 review by the Civil Aviation Administration of China after the Cultural Revolution, nine participants died or were disabled due to persecution, 57 were imprisoned or disciplined, and 154 were subjected to study classes or general political pressure. Chinese dissidents such as former associate professor Tan Song of Chongqing Normal University's Foreign Trade College and writer Zhao Xu stated that by 1979, over 500 defectors to the Communist Party had been nearly wiped out by persecution. In Beijing alone, 48 people were persecuted to death as alleged "agents of the U.S. and the Kuomintang." The pilot who planned and commanded the Beifei operation, Pan Guoding, suffered a broken spine due to persecution.

== Commemoration ==
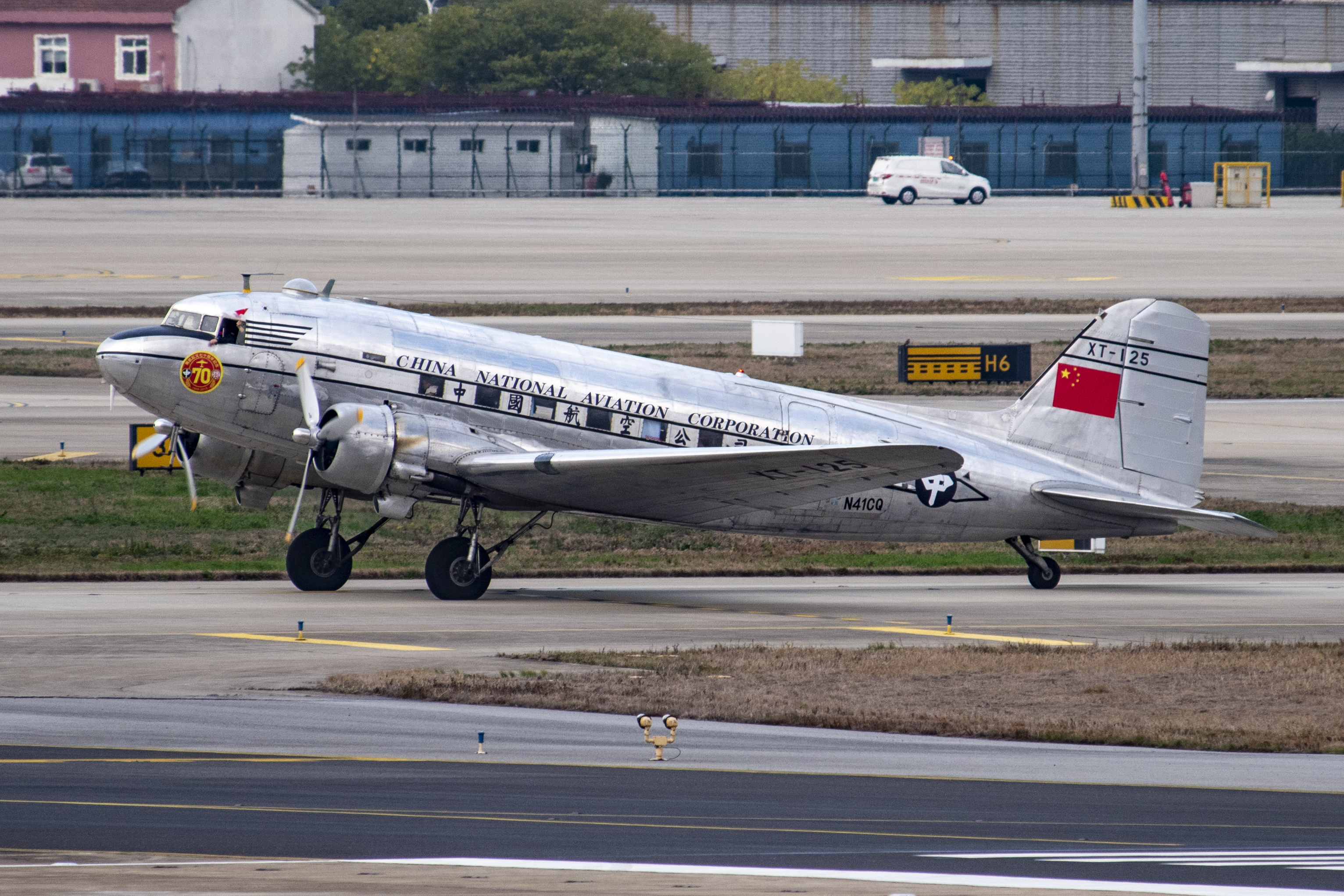
A Douglas DC-3 painted in commemorative AVIC livery waits for takeoff at Shanghai Hongqiao International Airport.

From December 3 to 6, 2019, to commemorate the 70th anniversary of the Two Airlines Incident, a private collector in mainland China purchased a Douglas DC-3 and painted it in retro livery. The aircraft completed a commemorative flight along the route of the original uprising aircraft: from Nanchang Changbei to Hong Kong Chek Lap Kok, then to Guangzhou Baiyun, followed by Shanghai Hongqiao, and finally to Beijing Daxing.

=== Sources ===
Books
Anna Chennault：《驚心動魄的兩航事件 》
