= Chen Shijun =

Chen Shijun may refer to:

- Chen Yi (general) (1901–1972), Chinese general, politician and diplomat, originally named Chen Shijun (陳世俊).
- Steve Chen (born 1978), Taiwanese-born American co-founder of YouTube. His Chinese name Chen Shih Chun (陳士駿) is romanized as Chen Shijun in pinyin.
- Chen Shijun (student) 陈施君 (1999–2021), a female college student at Ningbo University of Technology, raped and murdered by her English teacher, an African American.
