= Xinyu Zhang =

Chinese computer software engineer (born 1955)

Xinyu Zhang 张新宇
- Born: March 5, 1955 (age 71); Ordos, Inner Mongolia
- Other name: laiXi Zhang
- Education: East China University of Technology; Chinese Academy of Sciences; South China University of Technology
- Occupations: engineer, software developer, Internet expert, sponsor of global information free movement
- Known for: Promote Chinese democracy movement, sponsor of Global Information Free Movement, technical expert of tear down the China network Berlin Wall
- Awards: Business Plan Competition Emerging Artists Award (2005)

Xinyu Zhang (born 5 March 1955 in Ordos, Inner Mongolia) is a Chinese computer software engineer. He was a teacher at Inner Mongolia Normal University. He served as a leader of the CIMS Research Office of the Guangzhou City Productivity Center, general manager of the He-Yi Digital Technology Co., Ltd. Tianjin, led foreign experts in computer science of Ningbo University of Technology and Chairman of the NinBo Tian Mei Technology Co.. He was involved in December 1986 China democracy movement and June 4, 1989 China democracy movement.

== Early life ==
Before age 22, Zhang studied in Hangjinqi Erdos, Inner Mongolia. He worked as a production team leader and a private primary school teacher.

After the Cultural Revolution in China in 1977, he attended the first session of the university entrance examination and was admitted by East China Chemical Engineering institute in Shanghai. In March 1982, he was assigned to Inner Mongolia Normal University. He taught and participated in the negotiations over equipment procurement for the school testing center.

In 1986, he was admitted to the joint training plan of graduate students by Department of Materials of Zhejiang University and the (Chinese Academy) Shanghai Institute of Optics and Fine Mechanics. During this period, he created a flux method of crystal growth. He earned a master's degree in 1989 and was employed as an engineer of the Electronic Engineering department of Shenzhen University, specializing in research on phase-conjugate mirrors in fiber optics.

In order to learn more about computer technology, Chang was admitted to the South China University of Technology as a PhD student in 1991, specializing in Computer Integrated Manufacturing System (CIMS) applications in the ceramic industry. During his studies, he developed application software systems for government departments in Guangzhou City.

== Career ==
In 1996, Zhang was employed as the leader of Guangzhou Institute of Computer Application CIMS Research Office, and general manager of Guangzhou Cash Register Company and general manager of Guangdong and sanmei company.

He emigrated to Canada in 1999 and was naturalized as a Canadian citizen in 2002. During this period, he mainly developed computer software and created computer technology services.

In 2003, Zhang was employed as general manager of Tianjin HeYi Digital Technology Co., Ltd. In 2004, he was employed as general manager of Guangzhou Jia Computer Technology Co., Ltd. In September of this year, he was employed as a foreign expert of Ningbo University of Technology and returned to Canada in 2007. During three years in Ningbo, he served as general manager of Tian Mei Technology Co., Ltd., served as project Leader of high-tech project for Ningbo Municipal Science and Technology Committee (NMSTC) and served as expert in enterprise information technology for Ningbo Municipal Economic Committee. He completed 3 high-tech projects of NMSTC, mobile office service platform system based on a three dimensional digital enterprise map, interactive network monitoring, on demand system based on three-dimensional virtual reality, and multi-point gas leak sensor network early warning system based on a nano-sensing chip.

He won the 2005 China Ningbo Technology Business Plan Competition Emerging Artists Award. He developed many application systems, such as point of sale (POS) and web POS integrated systems for pharmacies, a nano gas sensor based on LBS technology 3G, and manufacturing enterprise geographic information system (GIS) visualization integrated information service management system. Zhang obtained the first results of merit-based funding for foreign students of science and technology in 2006.

Zhang actively participated in the 1986 student democracy movement in Shanghai, China and Shanghai Solidarity activities for Beijing Tiananmen Square democracy movement in 1989. In 1999, Zhang risked arrest and took the "Guangming Daily" from Guangzhou to Vancouver, Canada. He presented Wang Dan, who was visiting Vancouver at that time, and hoped to help him work to promote democracy in China. In 2008, he launched the "Global Information Free Movement", and developed the website Global Information Free Movement. In the same year, as technical director, he completed design and programming of the China Talk website, an e-magazine sponsored by Yang Jianli.

== See also ==
- Chinese democracy movement
- 08 Charter
