= Shen Chong case =

Rape case leading to anti-American movement in China (1946)

The Shen Chong case (Chinese: 沈崇案; pinyin: Shěn Chóng àn; Wade–Giles: Shen^{3} Ch'ung^{2} an^{4}), also referred to as the Peiping rape case, was a rape case in 1946 that sparked a nationwide anti-American movement in the Republic of China. It involved United States Marines stationed in China (the "China Marines") raping a Chinese university student in Beiping (now Beijing).

== The case ==
On Christmas Eve, 1946, U.S. Marine corporal William Gaither Pierson and private Warren T. Pritchard stopped Shen Chong, a Peking University student, on her way home and forced her into the Peiping Polo Field. A mechanic from a nearby repair shop reported the crying girl being dragged into the field, first to his peers, then to the police. The mechanics were driven away by the soldiers when they tried to intervene, even with a policeman accompanying in the second attempt. By the time a senior officer arrived at the scene, Pritchard had already left. Later Pierson was convicted of rape by U.S. Marine Court led by Lieutenant Colonel Paul Fitzgerald and sentenced to 15 years in prison. However, the verdict was overturned by the U.S. Department of Navy for insufficient evidence.

== Public anger ==
Pierson and U.S. consular official Myrl Myres claimed that Shen Chong was a prostitute, further fueling public anger. Shen came from an elite family descended from Shen Baozhen and Lin Zexu and was studying at China's most prestigious university; the accusation was thus seen as adding insult to injury. The situation escalated when Chen Hsueh-ping—a senior Kuomintang official, psychology professor at Peking University, and reportedly a relative of Shen—questioned her enrollment and criticized her for walking alone at night. His remarks, alongside the American narrative, reinforced perceptions of victim-blaming and helped spark nationwide student protests and surging anti-Americanism in China. Selective reporting in United States media and the later acquittal of the soldiers only intensified Chinese outrage over the American military presence.

In February 1947 alone, police arrested thousands of rape case protesters. The government of the Republic of China's action alienated students and intellectuals and pushed them closer to the Chinese Communist Party (CCP), who played a leading role in the protests.

== Aftermath ==
Because of the intense publicity, Shen Chong was unable to continue her studies at Peking University. She changed her name to Shen Jun (Chinese: 沈峻; pinyin: Shěn Jùn; Wade–Giles: Shen^{3} Chün^{4}) and later was admitted to Fudan University in Shanghai. After graduating with a degree in Russian, she worked in Beijing-based Foreign Languages Press for decades. She married the renowned Chinese cartoonist Ding Cong. For most of her life, the public was unaware of the whereabouts of Shen Chong. In an interview with a journalist in 2012, Shen Jun finally revealed that she was Shen Chong; she also refuted a conspiracy theory that she was collaborating with the CCP to provoke an international incident. She stated that she joined the CCP in 1956, nearly a decade after the incident. Shen died of lung cancer in Beijing on December 11, 2014, aged 87.

William Gaither Pierson died in 2001 and is buried at Temple Sinai Cemetery in Sumter, South Carolina.

== See also ==
- China Marines
- Murder of Chen Shijun
