= Ford F-Series (fourteenth generation) =

Fourteenth generation of the Ford F-Series trucks

Fourteenth-generation Ford F-Series (P702)
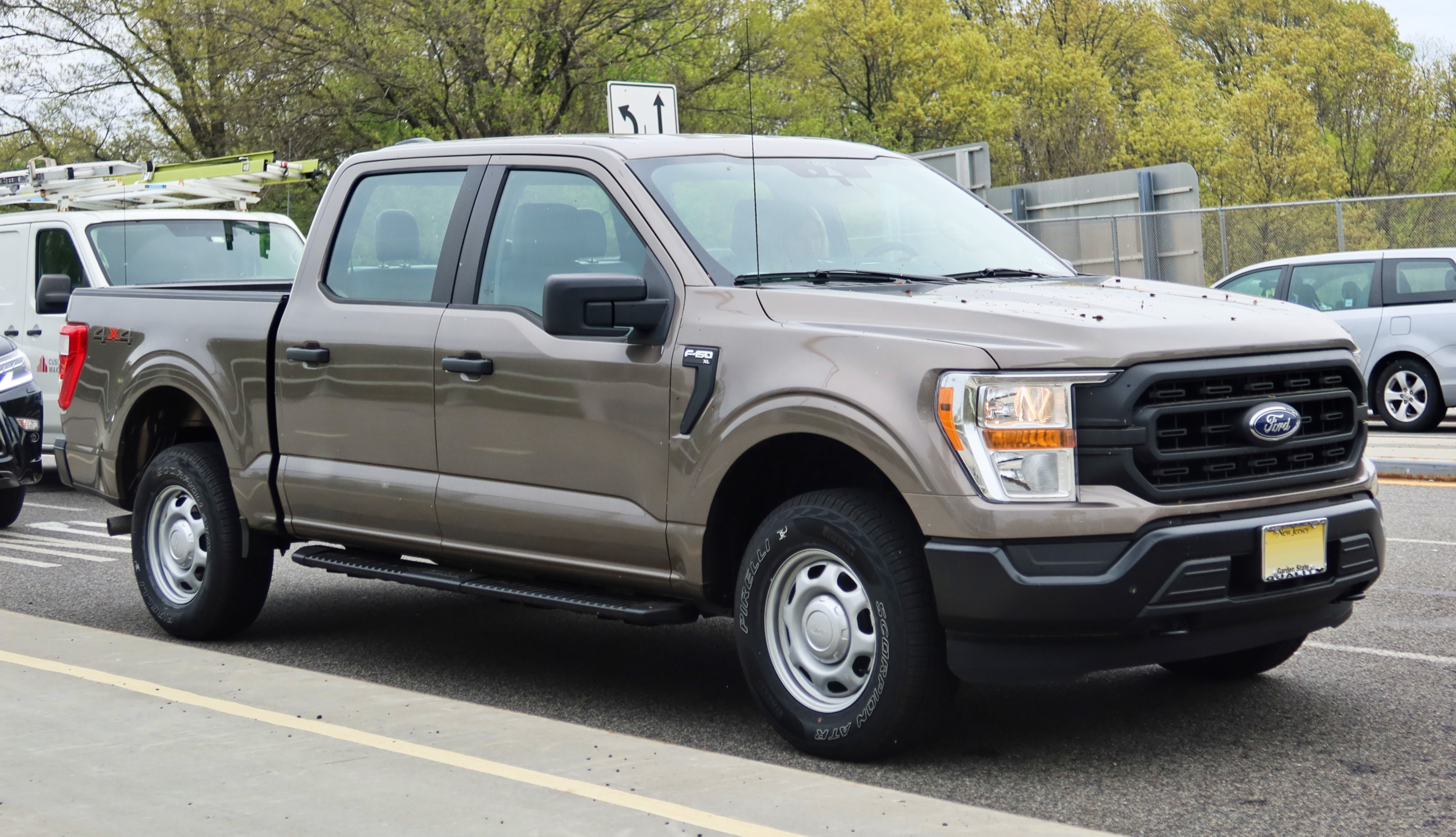
- 2021 F-150 XL SuperCrew

Overview
- Manufacturer: Ford Motor Company
- Also called: Ford Lobo (Mexico)
- Production: October 12, 2020 – present
- Model years: 2021–present
- Assembly: United States: Claycomo, Missouri (Kansas City Assembly); Dearborn, Michigan (Dearborn Truck Plant); Australia: Mickleham, Victoria (Ford Australia, RHD Conversion)
- Designer: Raleigh Haire (2016)

Body and chassis
- Class: Full-size pickup truck
- Body style: 2-door regular cab; 2+2-door extended cab (SuperCab); 4-door crew cab (SuperCrew)
- Layout: Front-engine, rear-wheel drive; Front-engine, four-wheel drive
- Platform: Ford T3
- Related: Ford Super Duty (P708); Ford F-150 Lightning

Powertrain
- Engine: Gasoline: 2.7 L EcoBoost Nano twin-turbo V6 (2021–2026); 3.0 L EcoBoost Nano twin-turbo V6 (2027–); 3.5 L EcoBoost D35 twin-turbo V6; 5.2 L Carnivore V8 (Raptor R); Flex-fuel: 3.3 L Cyclone V6 (2021–2023); 5.0 L Coyote V8; Gasoline Hybrid: 3.5 L PowerBoost twin-turbo V6; Diesel: 3.0 L Power Stroke turbo V6 (2021)
- Electric motor: 35 kW (47 hp) BorgWarner HVH250 (hybrid)
- Transmission: 10-speed 10R80 SelectShift automatic
- Hybrid drivetrain: Power-split
- Battery: 1.5 kWh lithium-ion (hybrid)
- Plug-in charging: V2L: 7.2 kW (hybrid), 2 kW (petrol)

Dimensions
- Wheelbase: Regular Cab: 122.8–141.5 in (3,119–3,594 mm); SuperCab: 145.4–164.1 in (3,693–4,168 mm); SuperCrew: 145.4–157.2 in (3,693–3,993 mm)
- Length: Regular Cab: 209.1–227.7 in (5,311–5,784 mm); SuperCab: 231.7–250.3 in (5,885–6,358 mm); SuperCrew: 231.7–243.5 in (5,885–6,185 mm); Raptor: 232.6 in (5,908 mm)
- Width: Standard: 79.9 in (2,029 mm); Raptor: 86.6 in (2,200 mm)
- Height: Regular Cab: 75.2–77 in (1,910–1,956 mm); SuperCab: 75.5–77.2 in (1,918–1,961 mm); SuperCrew: 75.6–77.6 in (1,920–1,971 mm); Tremor: 79.3 in (2,014 mm); Raptor: 79.8–80.7 in (2,027–2,050 mm)
- Curb weight: ≥ 4,021 lb (1,824 kg)

Chronology
- Predecessor: Ford F-Series (thirteenth generation)

The fourteenth-generation Ford F-Series is a range of pickup trucks produced by Ford, introduced for the 2021 model year. This was the first generation to include a fully-electric and hybrid pickup truck among the offerings, with the F-150 Lightning EV having entered production in 2022 and being discontinued in 2025. The F-150 is positioned above the mid-size Ranger but below the larger Super Duty in the Ford truck lineup.

== Design ==
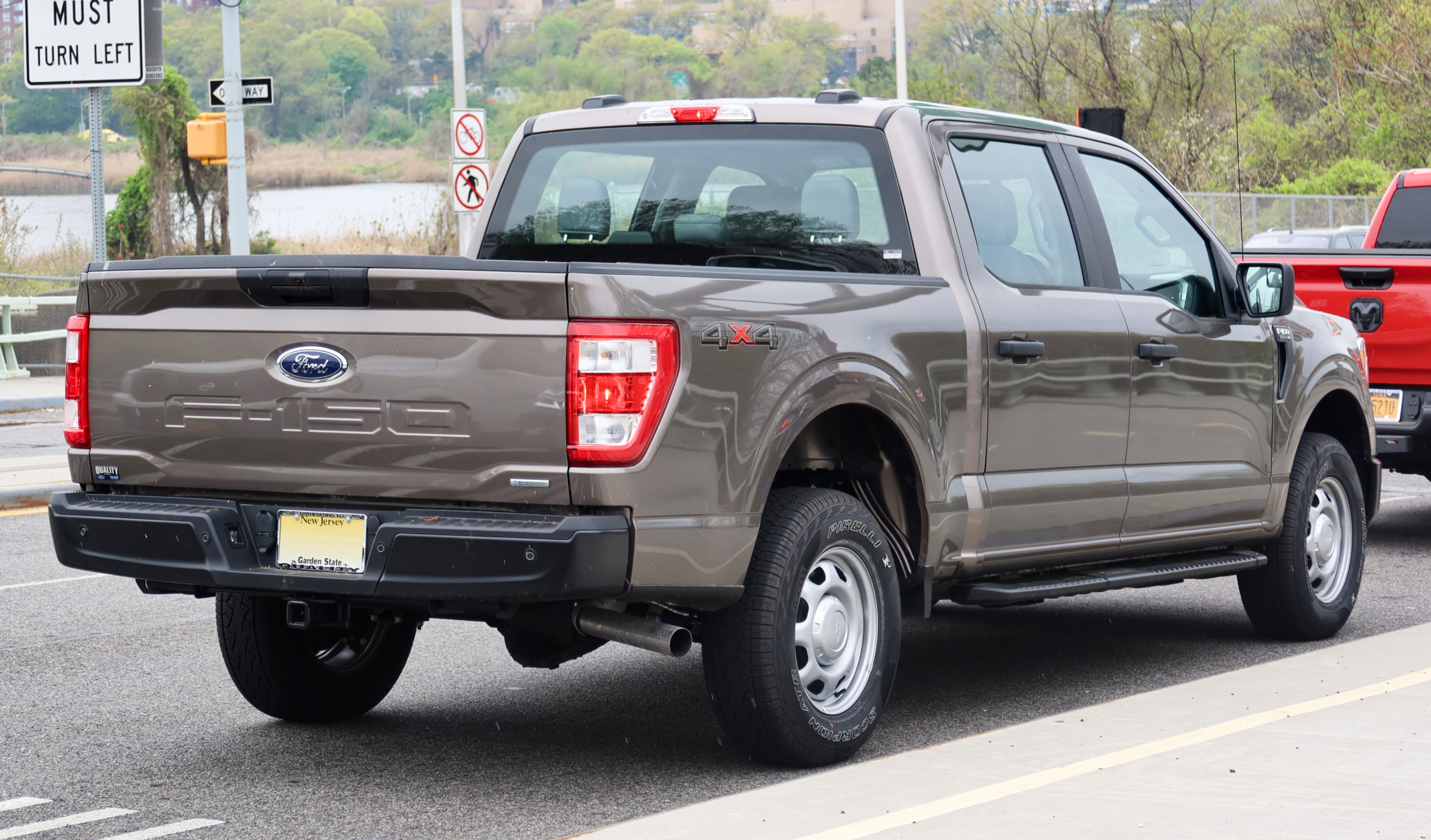
2021 F-150 XL SuperCrew rear

Despite sharing a strong visual resemblance to the previous generation, the 2021 F-150 underwent a redesign of 92% of its parts, carrying over only its cab, pickup box structure, and font design (including the tailgate script) from the 13th generation. The bed and cab configurations remain the same: regular cab and SuperCab (extended cab) trucks are available with 6.5-and-8-foot (2.0 and 2.4 m) beds, while SuperCrew (crew cab) trucks are available with 5.5-and-6.5-foot (1.7 and 2.0 m) boxes (the SuperCab with the 8-foot (2.4 m) box was dropped for 2024). Along with exterior design changes to enhance aerodynamics, many changes were made to the interior, adding fold-flat front seats and larger touchscreens (including a fully digital instrument panel on higher-end trims; now on all trims starting in the 2024 refresh).

The powertrain line is largely carried over from the previous generation, with a 3.3 L V6, 2.7 L and 3.5 L EcoBoost twin-turbo V6s, a 5.0 L V8, and a 3.0 L turbo-diesel V6. However, the 5.0 L V8 receives a new cylinder deactivation system, called Variable Displacement Engine technology, similar to GM's Active Fuel Management and Chrysler's Multi-Displacement System. All engines are paired to the ten-speed 10R80 automatic transmission. New for this generation of F-150 is a gasoline–electric hybrid powertrain. Dubbed PowerBoost, this powertrain is the first to be offered in a Ford pickup truck, pairing an electric motor with the 3.5 L V6 EcoBoost engine. The fourteenth generation F-150 is considered the first full-size true hybrid truck since GM's CVT-only Silverado/Sierra 1500 Hybrid was last offered in 2013.

Added to the lineup was a new Tremor trim level (the name derived from that of the Super Duty line and originally used as a special sport trim package for the 2014 F-150).

== Hybrid ==
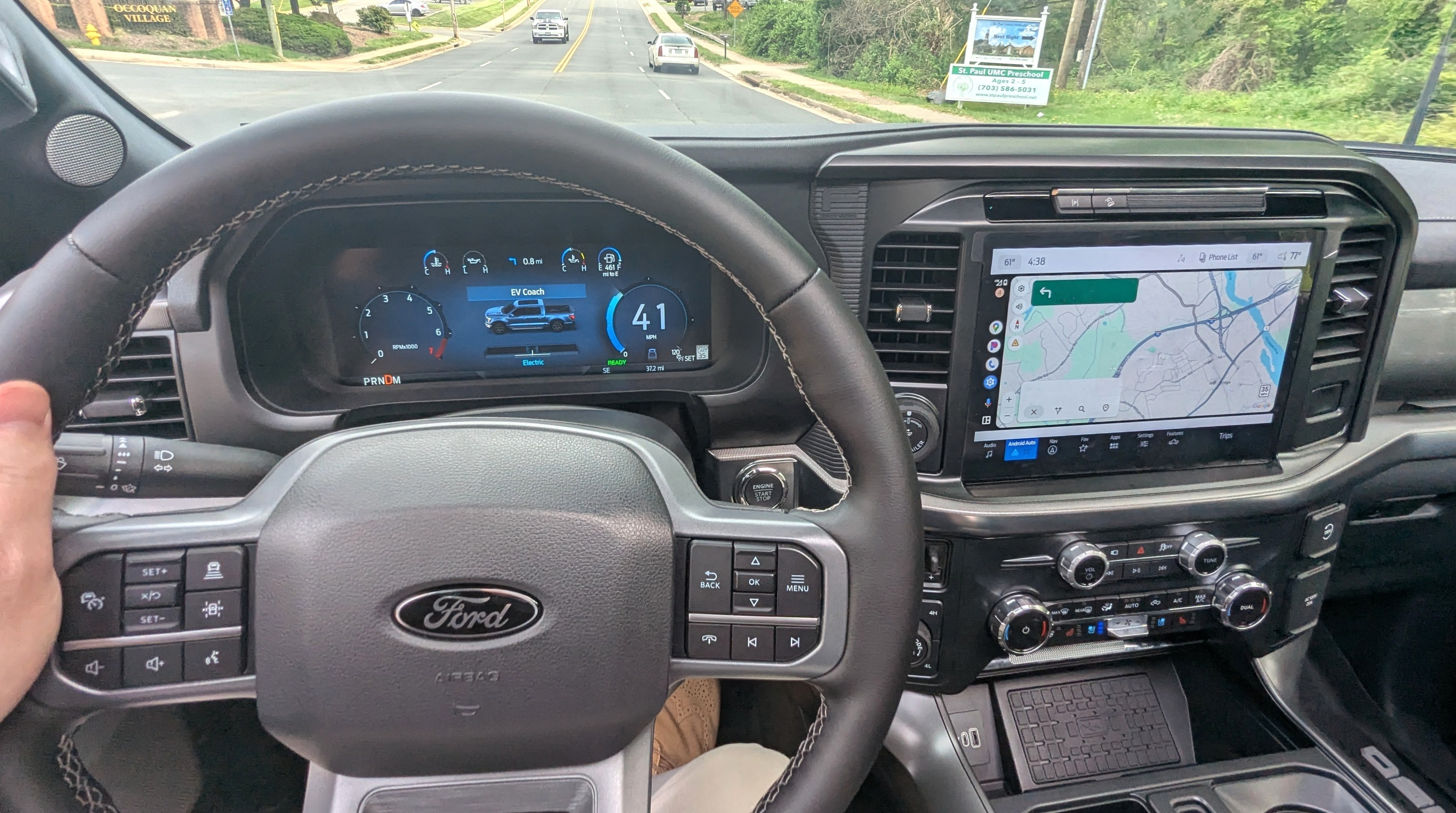
2025 F-150 Lariat PowerBoost driving in all-electric mode

Available only with the SuperCrew cab configuration, the hybrid version of the F-150, called the PowerBoost, combines a 3.5 L EcoBoost V6 with a 47 hp (35 kW) hybrid motor/generator between the engine and transmission. A 1.5 kWh lithium-ion battery pack is located under the bed. The net gain is 47 hp (35 kW) and 70 lb⋅ft (95 N⋅m). The electrical power also allowed Ford to have up to 7.2 kW in the bed of a truck, far exceeding the capacity of a normal 120 V receptacle. A 20 percent fuel economy increase over a base 3.5 L EcoBoost has been observed at combined city/highway driving. Depending on the trim, the hybrid option added at least $2,500 to the base price. All PowerBoost models receive a badge on the bottom of both front doors, and are assembled exclusively at the Dearborn Truck Plant in Dearborn, Michigan.

For 2024, the PowerBoost system has been updated with a simpler design. Both starters—one on the engine and the other integrated into the accessory belt drive—have been eliminated in favor of a mechanism that uses the transmission to start the engine via a hybrid motor. This change was made possible by the data and insights gathered from the launch model, combined with over 300 software enhancements. Additionally, all PowerBoost models now come standard with four-wheel drive, and the hybrid powertrain could be had at no cost over the 3.5 L non-hybrid EcoBoost engine.

Truck bed power outlets for Ford's 7.2 kW Pro Power Onboard generator on the F150 PowerBoost

Specifications:

- 0–60 mph acceleration: 5.4 seconds
- Maximum output: 430 hp (321 kW) at 6000 rpm, 570 lb⋅ft (773 N⋅m) torque at 3000 rpm
- Maximum payload: 2,120 pounds (960 kg)
- Maximum towing capacity: 12,700 pounds (5,800 kg)
- 2.4kW onboard generator with four 120V, 20A (NEMA 5-20R) outlets—two in cab, two in bed—standard
- Optional 7.2kW onboard generator with six 120V, 20A outlets—two in cab, four in bed—and one 240V, 30A (NEMA L14-30R) outlet in the bed

== F-150 Lightning ==
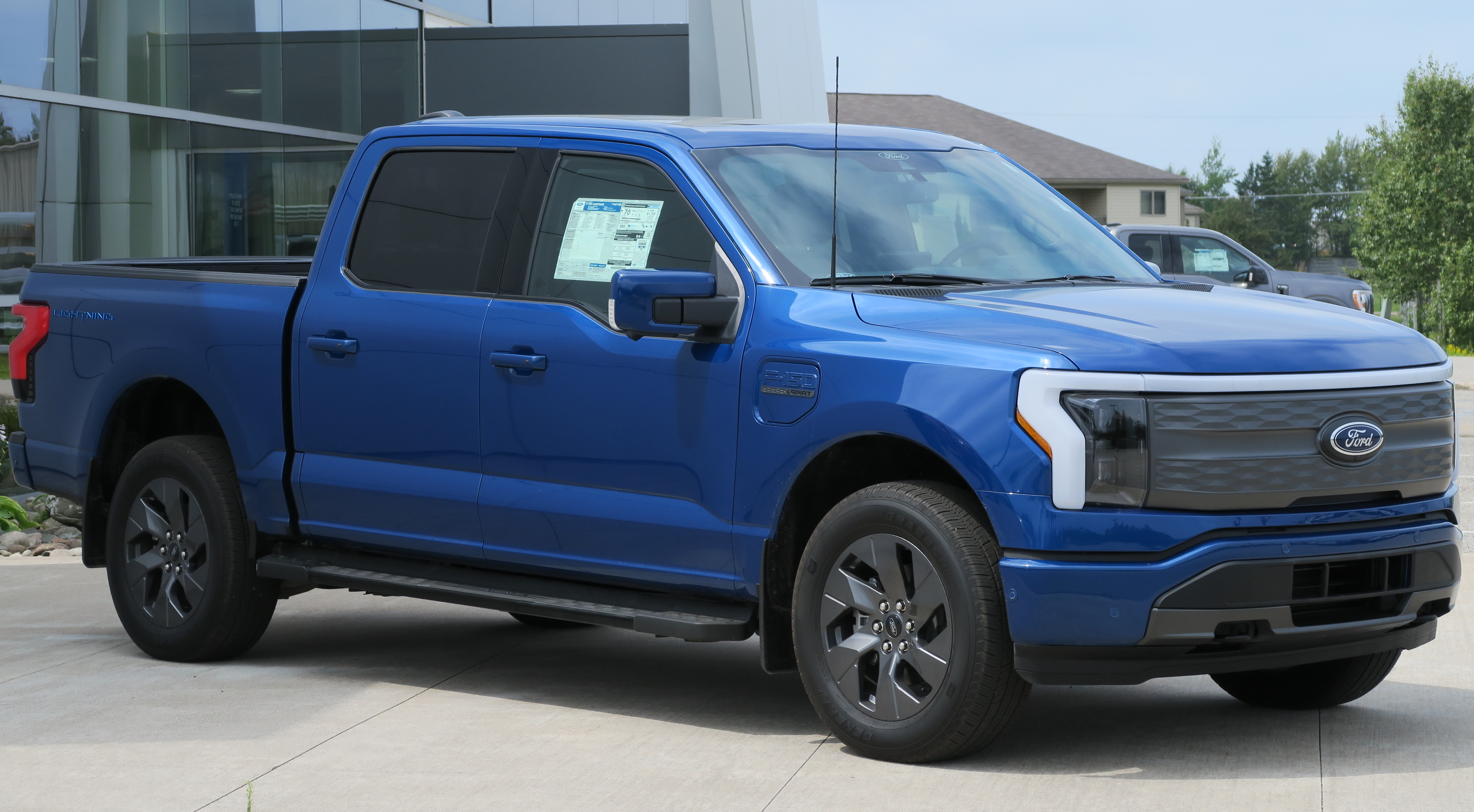
2022 Ford F-150 Lightning

Ford unveiled an electric version of the Ford F-150 called the F-150 Lightning, reviving the model name for the first time since the previous Lightning was discontinued after the 2004 model year (and 2004 concept). It debuted on May 19, 2021, and deliveries to customers began in May 2022. The F-150 Lightning has dual motors. It is built at the new Ford Rouge Electric Vehicle Center in Michigan.

Ford had previously announced the intention to produce a fully-electric light pickup at the 2019 Detroit Auto Show in January 2019. Prototype electric test mules on an existing F-150 body were tested during 2019, including a record-setting demonstration test tow of 1,250,000 pounds (570,000 kg) on rails.

In 2025, Ford stopped manufacturing the F-150 Lightning due to a failure to manufacture the vehicle and make profit from it.

== Raptor ==
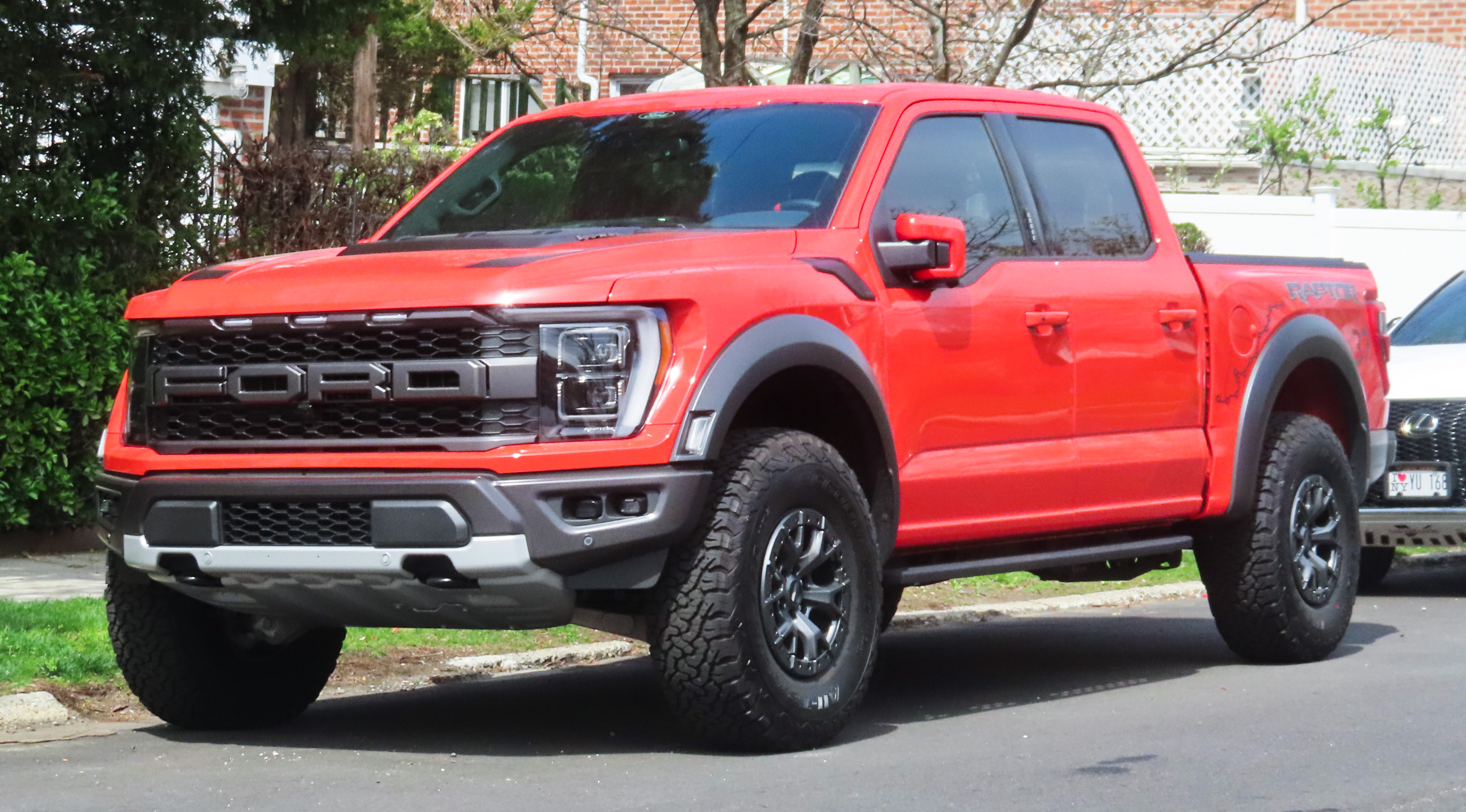
2021 Ford F-150 Raptor

The F-150 Raptor was announced in February 2021, and features a high-output variant of the 3.5 L EcoBoost twin-turbocharged V6 gasoline engine carried over from the previous generation. The Raptor now features rear coil springs and is only available in a SuperCrew cab configuration with a 5.5-foot box.

For the 2023 model year, the Raptor R made its debut, now receiving the 5.2 L supercharged V8 engine.

== Updates ==
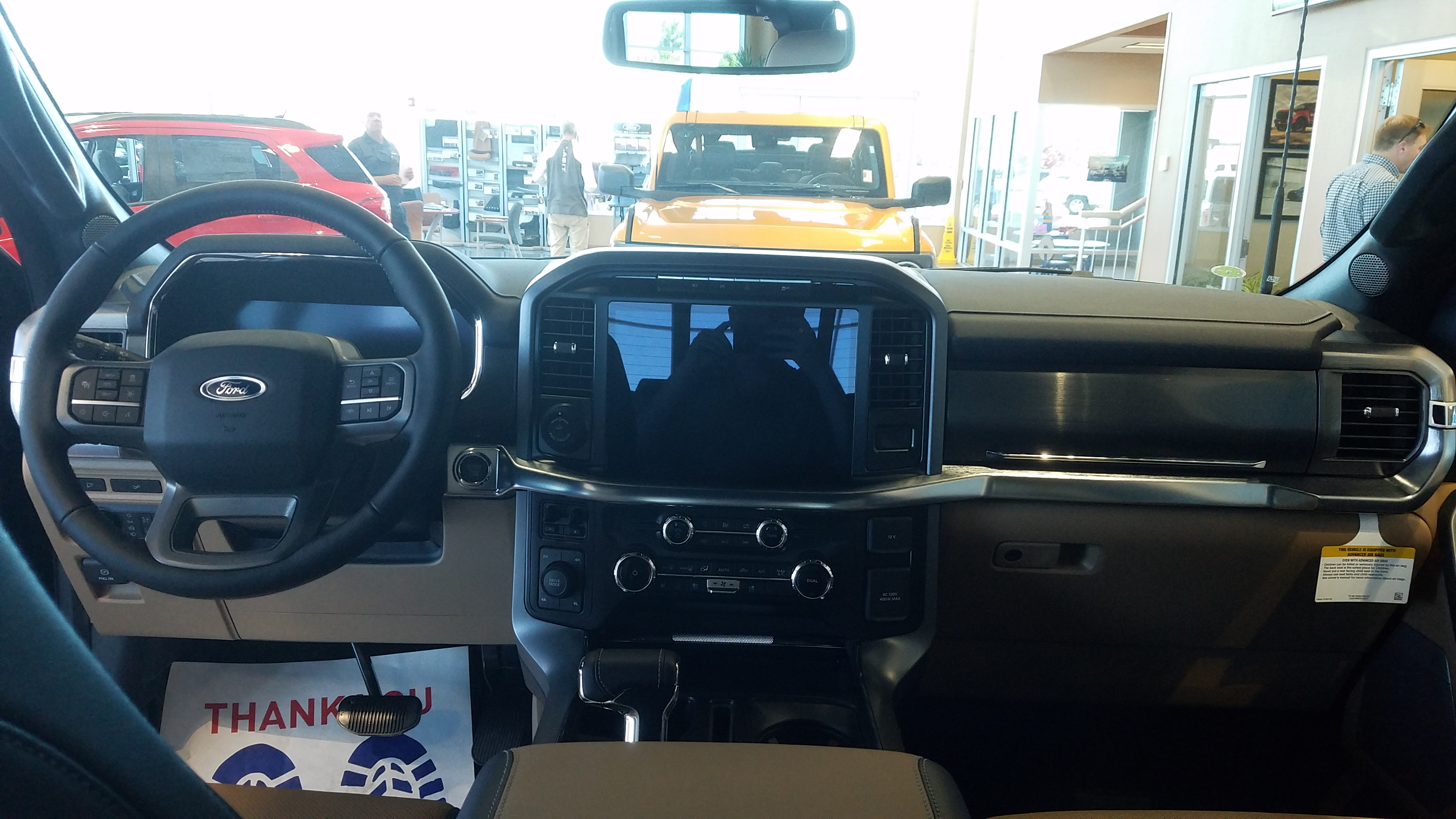
2022 Ford F-150 Lariat interior

In December 2020, Ford announced the return of the Tremor trim level for the F-150. Available only in the SuperCrew cab configuration with a 5.5-foot bed, the Tremor is designed for higher off-road capability than the FX4 off-road package. It features upgraded suspension and driveline hardware, as well as suspension travel, approach, breakover, and departure angles that are optimized for all-terrain conditions. It also has 33-inch General Grabber all-terrain tires mounted on unique, matte-finish 18-inch wheels, a standard rear locking differential, and an optional front Torsen limited-slip differential. It is available in three versions, each featuring a standard Raptor-style bash plate, off-road running boards, unique hood and grille with orange accents, orange-accented interior trim, and exclusive technology packages.

For the 2022 model year, the F-150 saw several minor updates, alongside the major introduction of the electrified F-150 Lightning. Most notably, the 3.0 L Power Stroke turbo-diesel engine was discontinued because of low consumer demand (except outside of North America). In addition, a new Black Appearance Package was available to order on XL (only with the optional STX package), XLT, Lariat, and Platinum trims.

For the 2023 model year, Ford launched a special F-150 Heritage Edition to honor the 75th anniversary of the first-generation F-Series pickups. The Heritage Edition, only available with the XLT trim and in a SuperCrew short box configuration, featured special two-tone paint jobs in five different color combinations and exclusive seat coverings. All 2023 F-150 and Super Duty models had the "Ford F-Series – 75 Years" logo on the top-center of the windshield, in place of the Ford logo on other model years. The SuperCab was dropped from the Lariat trim, leaving only the SuperCrew available in either a 5.5- or 6.5-foot box, while the Limited trim now came standard with four-wheel drive and PowerBoost. The Tremor was now available with the 5.0L V8 engine in addition to the 3.5L V6 EcoBoost engine.

Other trim packages introduced for the 2023 model year included the Raptor R and the Rattler. The Raptor R featured the 5.2L Carnivore supercharged V8 and was intended to compete with the Ram 1500 TRX. The Rattler is based on the XL trim with the FX4 off-road package and featured 18-inch black-painted aluminum wheels, LT265/70R18C all-terrain tires, electronic rear locking differential, and dual exhaust tips.

=== 2024 refresh ===
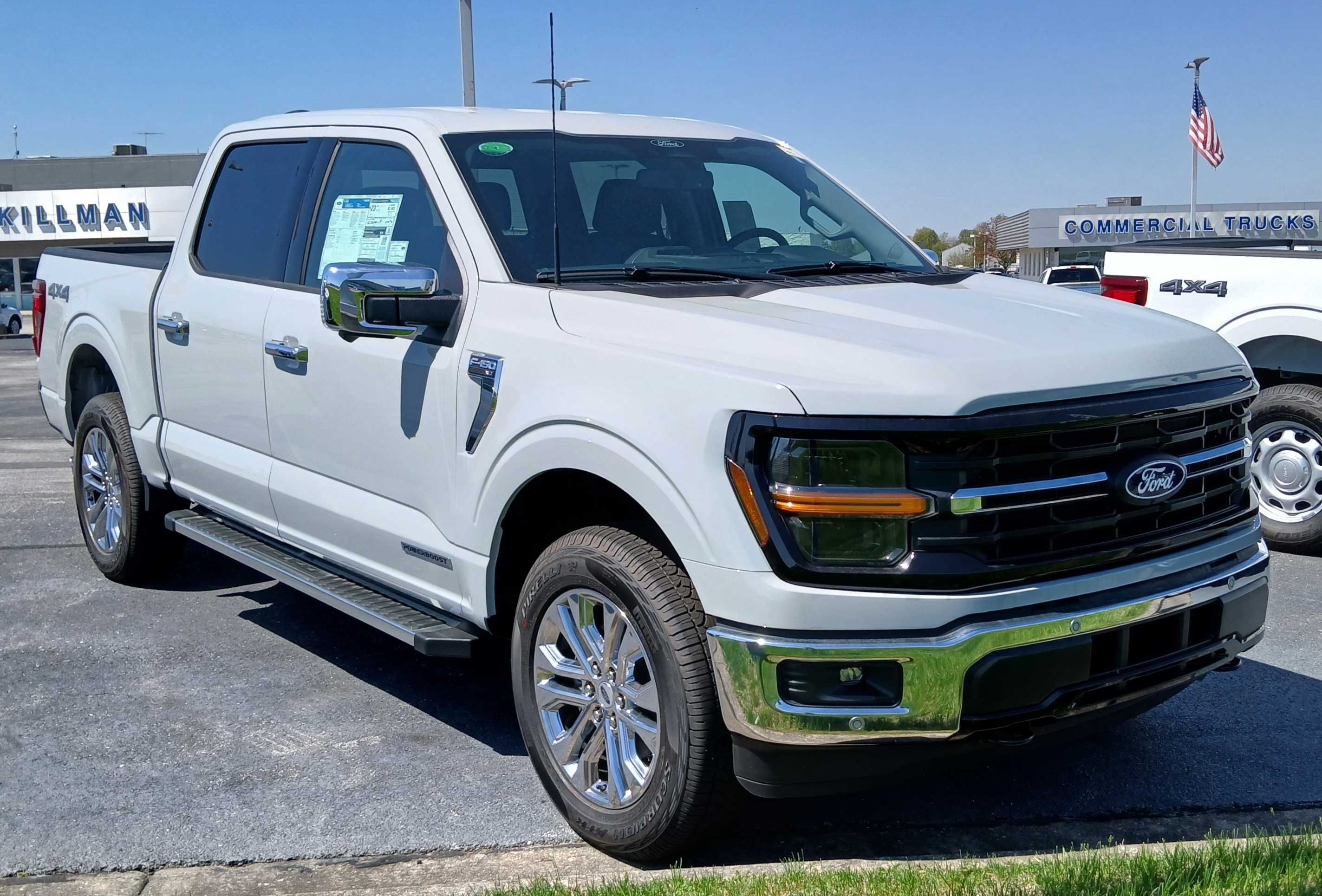
2024 Ford F-150 XLT PowerBoost

2025 Ford F-150 Lariat Pro Access Tailgate in operation

On September 12, 2023, Ford debuted a substantial exterior refresh for the 2024 F-150, including revised grilles, headlights, and taillights, along with numerous interior and mechanical changes. It is also available with the Pro Access Tailgate, a multifunction tailgate designed to compete with GM's and Ram's counterparts. In terms of trim-level changes, the STX is now offered as a separate trim level from the XL for the first time since 2014, the Rattler trim has been replaced with the STX FX4 package, and the Limited trim has been replaced with the "Platinum Plus" package for the Platinum trim.

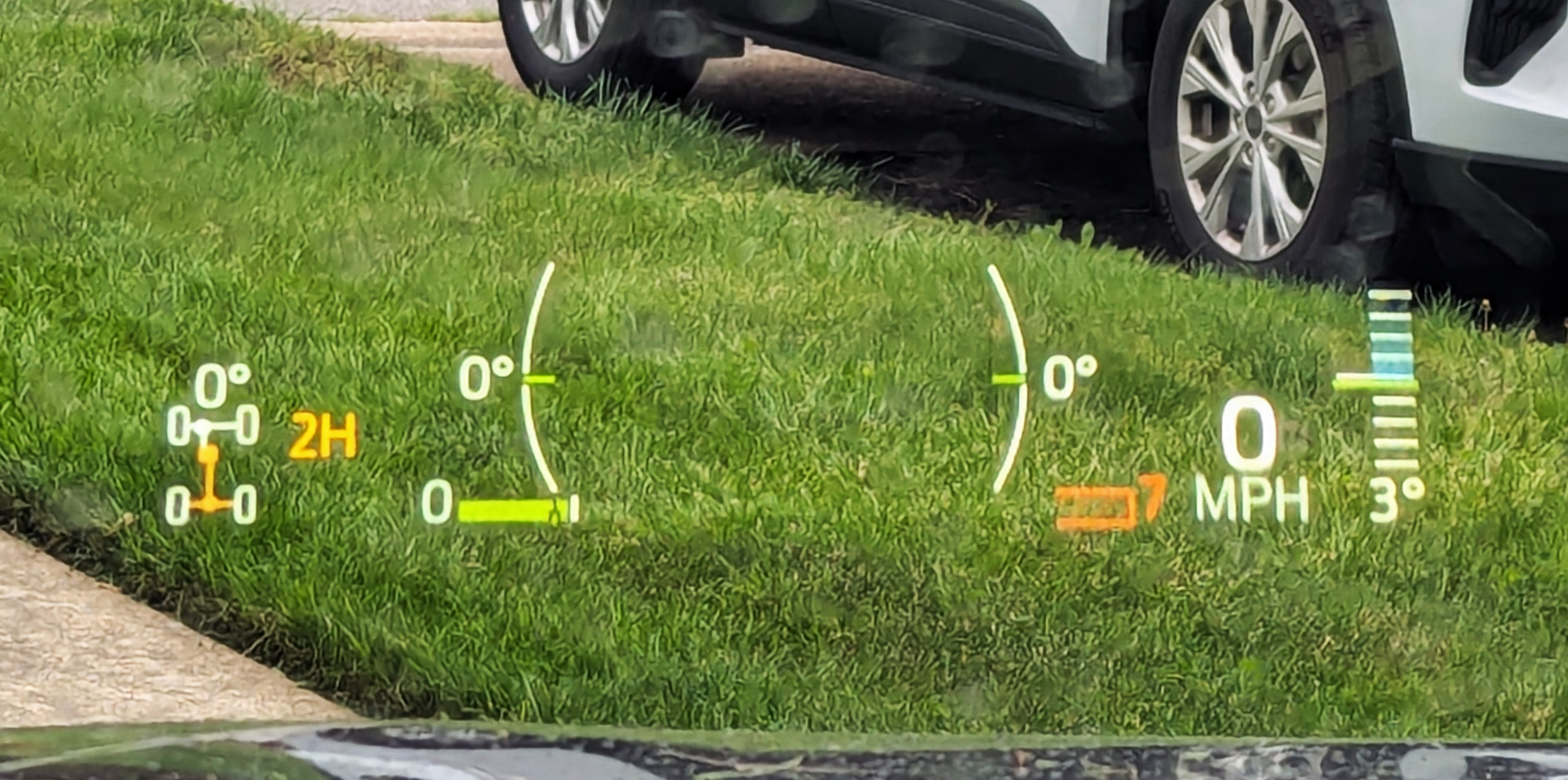
2025 Ford F150 configurable head-up display showing offroad instrumentation

On the interior, all F-150 models come with a standard 12-inch LCD-based instrument cluster and 12-inch touch-screen infotainment system with Sync 4. A head-up display is optional on higher-end trims. Other features that are now standard on all models include LED headlights, a blind spot monitor, rear parking sensors, Class IV trailer hitch, and 36-gallon fuel tank (except on PowerBoost or 123" wheelbase models). A subscription-based, hands-free driving assistance feature dubbed BlueCruise is now available on XLT (302A) and higher models.

In terms of powertrain changes, the 3.3-liter V6 engine has been removed from the lineup. Instead, the 2.7-liter EcoBoost V6 is now standard on XL, STX, and XLT models; the 5.0-liter V8 is standard on Lariat and Tremor trims (as well as the regular and SuperCrew cabs with the 6.5-foot box); the 3.5-liter EcoBoost V6 is standard on King Ranch, Platinum, and Raptor models; and the 5.2-liter supercharged V8 is exclusive to the Raptor R. Four-wheel drive is now standard on Lariat and higher trims, SuperCrew models with the 6.5-foot box, and PowerBoost models. Notably, the SuperCab with the 8-foot box has been discontinued in a first for the F-150 lineup, the EcoBoost badge has been removed from the tailgate, the Heavy-Duty Payload Package has been dropped, and the regular cab is only available with the XL trim. Ford has stated that these changes have reduced ordering complexity by 90 percent compared to the previous model year.

For 2025, lower-end models of the STX, XLT, and Lariat were introduced, and all Lariat models now featured seats upholstered with a synthetic material called "ActiveX"—a "leatherette" material made from recycled plastic bottles—instead of traditional leather. Ford's proprietary keypad entry system, marketed as SecuriCode, became optional on XLT and higher trims as a dealer-installed option.

Later in the 2025 model year, Ford introduced the Lobo appearance package for the STX trim. Designed to appeal to enthusiasts of street-style pickup trucks, the Lobo package includes a 10-piece ground appearance package that visually and functionally lowers the vehicle by two inches compared to a base XL model. Key design features include a unique painted upper grille with integrated light bar, cowl hood, distinctive headlamps and taillamps, and blacked-out exterior trim, including the hood vents, badging, exhaust, and 22-inch gloss-black wheels. The Lobo features the 5.0-liter V8 paired with a two-speed automatic four-wheel-drive system and a 3.73:1 rear-axle ratio, and is exclusively available on SuperCrew models.

For 2026, there were several changes. On the STX trim, the 5.0-liter V8 was discontinued on non-Lobo models, while the PowerBoost hybrid became available on the STX Mid model. The instrument cluster on XL and STX trims reverted to a more traditional design with needle-style gauges and a four-inch LCD. An optional XLT Chrome Appearance Package was introduced, featuring 20-inch PVD chrome-like wheels, chrome-plated door handles and exhaust tip, chrome-plated center grille bar, and anodized running boards. Lariat, King Ranch, and Platinum trims were once again available with two-wheel drive (but only on non-hybrid SuperCrew models with the 5.5-foot box). The 3.5-liter EcoBoost V6 became the standard engine for most models that previously came standard with the 5.0-liter V8, except for the STX Lobo. On PowerBoost models, the PowerBoost emblem on the front doors has been redesigned.

For the 2027 model year, the 2.7-liter EcoBoost V6 was removed from the engine lineup and replaced with Ford's 3.0-liter EcoBoost V6 which has been found in other Ford vehicles since 2016. The 3.0-liter puts out 325 hp (242 kW) at 5500 rpm and 400 lb⋅ft (542 N⋅m) at 2250 rpm. These power numbers are identical to the outgoing 2.7-liter but the 3.0-liter achieves peak torque 750 rpm lower than the 2026 2.7-liter's 3000 rpm peak torque. As of the 2027 model year, the 3.0-liter EcoBoost V6 features only direct injection, not Ford's dual injection/PFDI fuel system.

== Australian export ==
In March 2022, Ford announced plans to officially export the F-150 to Australia beginning in 2023. The truck is imported in its native left-hand-drive configuration and converted to right-hand drive to conform to Australian Design Rules by RMA Automotive in Mickleham, Victoria. At launch, only the SuperCrew body style with the XLT and Lariat trims were offered and powered by the 3.5 L EcoBoost V6 mated to the 10-speed Ford 10R80 automatic with four-wheel drive. Order banks for the Australian F-150 opened in late February 2023 with deliveries commencing in the third quarter of 2023, and pricing before on-road costs starting at A$106,950 (US$80,414).

== Powertrains ==
Engine Type	Fuel Type	Model Year	Output		Transmission	Availability
Engine Type	Fuel Type	Model Year	Power	Torque	Transmission	Availability
3.3 L (200 cu in) Cyclone V6	Flexible-fuel	2021–2023	290 hp (216 kW) at 6,500 rpm	265 lb⋅ft (359 N⋅m) at 4,000 rpm	10-speed 10R80 SelectShift automatic	Standard on XL and XLT (up to 145" wheelbase); Not available with FX4 off-road package
5.0 L (310 cu in) Coyote V8	Flexible-fuel	2021–	400 hp (298 kW) at 6,000 rpm	410 lb⋅ft (556 N⋅m) at 4,250 rpm	10-speed 10R80 SelectShift automatic	Standard on 2021–23 King Ranch and Platinum, 2023– Tremor, and 2024– Lariat; Also standard with 4×4 157" and 164" wheelbase models, as well as with Heavy-Duty Payload Package; Optional on XL, STX, XLT, and 2021–23 Lariat; Flex-fuel capability dropped for 2024
2.7 L (160 cu in) EcoBoost Nano V6	Gasoline	2021–2026	325 hp (242 kW) at 5,000 rpm	400 lb⋅ft (542 N⋅m) at 3,000 rpm	10-speed 10R80 SelectShift automatic	Standard on 2021–23 Lariat, and 2024–26 XL, STX, and XLT; Also standard with 4×2 157" and 164" wheelbase models; Optional on 2021–23 XL and XLT; Not available with 4×4 157" and 164" wheelbase models, or with 2024– 122" wheelbase models
3.0 L (180 cu in) EcoBoost Nano V6	Gasoline	2027–	325 hp (242 kW) at 5,500 rpm	400 lb⋅ft (542 N⋅m) at 2,250 rpm	10-speed 10R80 SelectShift automatic	Standard on 2027– F-150 XL, STX, XLT, and Lariat models; Not available on 122" and 157" wheelbase models
3.5 L (210 cu in) EcoBoost D35 V6	Gasoline	2021–	400 hp (298 kW) at 6,000 rpm	500 lb⋅ft (678 N⋅m) at 3,100 rpm	10-speed 10R80 SelectShift automatic	Standard on 2021–22 Tremor and Limited, 2024– King Ranch and Platinum, and Police Responder; Not available with 122" wheelbase models, or on 2024– STX
3.5 L (210 cu in) EcoBoost D35 high-output V6	Gasoline	2021–	450 hp (336 kW) at 5,000 rpm	510 lb⋅ft (691 N⋅m) at 3,500 rpm	10-speed 10R80 SelectShift automatic	Raptor only
3.5 L (210 cu in) PowerBoost V6	Hybrid electric	2021–	430 hp (321 kW) at 6,000 rpm	570 lb⋅ft (773 N⋅m) at 3,000 rpm	10-speed 10R80 SelectShift automatic	SuperCrew models only; Standard on 2023 Limited and 2024– Platinum Plus; 2024–2025 models require 4×4; Fleet only on XL since 2024; not available on Tremor, Raptor, or 2021–25 STX
3.0 L (180 cu in) Power Stroke V6	Diesel	2021	250 hp (186 kW) at 3,250 rpm	440 lb⋅ft (597 N⋅m) at 1,750 rpm	10-speed 10R80 SelectShift automatic	Only on 145" and 157" wheelbase models
5.2 L (320 cu in) Carnivore V8	Gasoline	2023	700 hp (522 kW) at 6,650 rpm	640 lb⋅ft (868 N⋅m) at 4,250 rpm	10-speed 10R80 SelectShift automatic	Raptor R only
5.2 L (320 cu in) Carnivore high-output V8	Gasoline	2024–	720 hp (537 kW) at 6,650 rpm	640 lb⋅ft (868 N⋅m) at 4,250 rpm	10-speed 10R80 SelectShift automatic	Raptor R only

For 2026, the 3.5-liter EcoBoost V6 became the standard engine for most models that previously came standard with the 5.0-liter V8, except for the STX Lobo.

== Safety ==
Sitting higher than other consumer vehicles (other than other pickup trucks), the Ford F-Series vehicles have significantly larger blind spots in which people or other cars are invisible to the driver. According to data from the National Highway Traffic Safety Administration, Ford F-Series vehicles are part of more fatal crashes than any other vehicle in the US.

The 2022 F-150 was tested by the IIHS and its top trim received a Top Safety Pick award:

IIHS 2022 Ford F-150 SuperCrew scores
Small overlap front (Driver)	Good	
Small overlap front (Passenger)	Good	
Moderate overlap front	Good	
Side (original test)	Good	
Roof strength	Good	
Head restraints and seats	Good	
Headlights	Good / Acceptable / Poor	varies by trim/option
Front crash prevention (Vehicle-to-Vehicle)	Superior	optional
Front crash prevention (Vehicle-to-Vehicle)	Superior	standard
Front crash prevention (Vehicle-to-Pedestrian, day)	Advanced	optional
Front crash prevention (Vehicle-to-Pedestrian, day)	Superior	standard
Seat belt reminders	Poor	
Child seat anchors (LATCH) ease of use	Marginal	

ANCAP test results Ford F-150 Platinum & Lariat variants (2025)
Overall
Grading:	81% (Platinum)	
Test	Points	%
Pedestrian:	19.71	82%
Safety assist:	10.14	81%

== "Rocket League" Edition ==
On February 10, 2021, the 2021 F-150 made its very first game debut in the 2015 vehicular soccer game Rocket League, particularly a SuperCab configuration missing side-view mirrors.
