= Ford F-150 Lightning =

Battery electric light duty truck

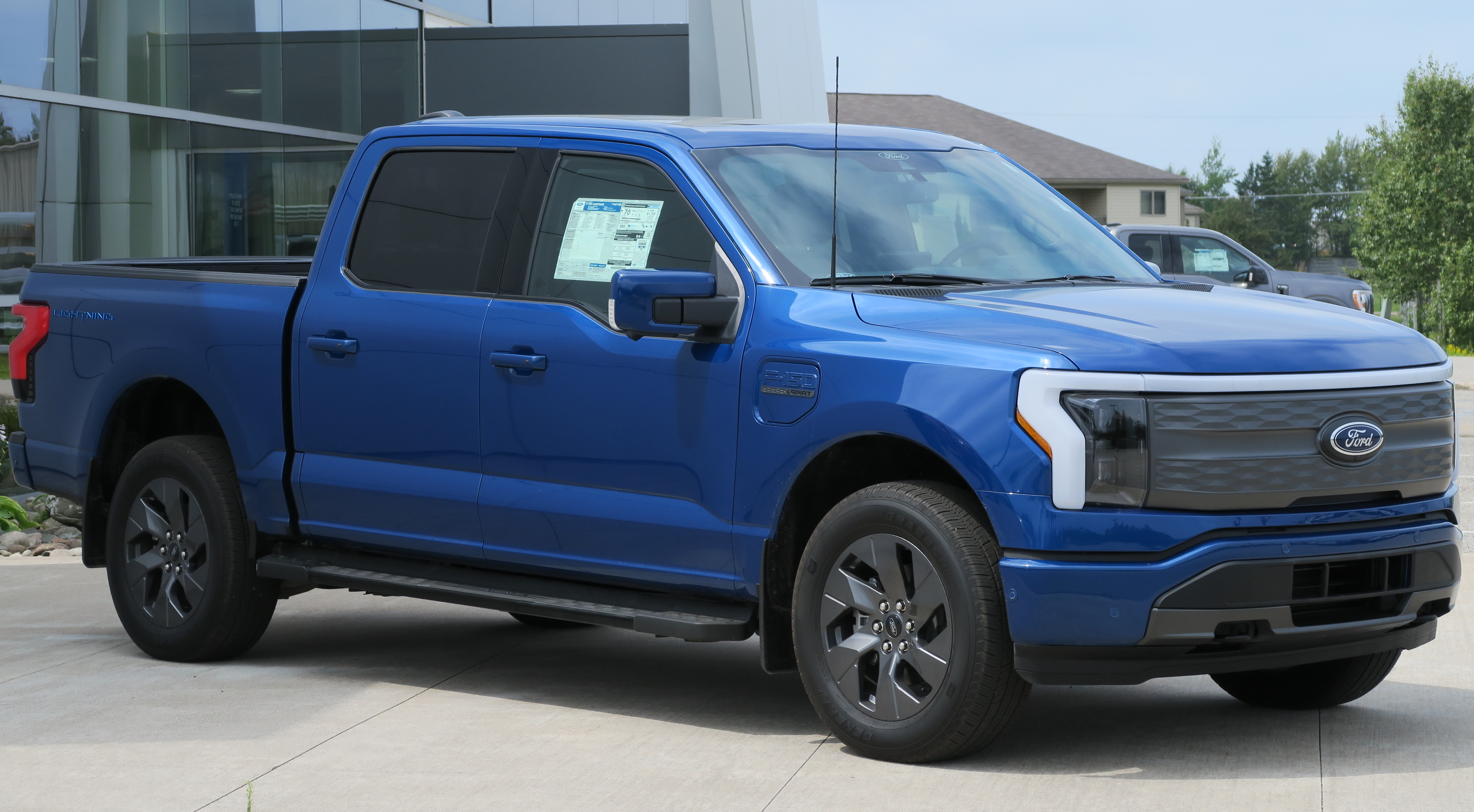

Overview
- Manufacturer: Ford Motor Company
- Production: April 2022–December 2025
- Model years: 2022–2025
- Assembly: United States: Dearborn, Michigan (Rouge Electric Vehicle Center)
- Designer: Linda Zhang (chief engineer); Raleigh Haire, Josh Henry (exterior)

Body and chassis
- Class: Full-size pickup truck
- Layout: Dual-motor, four-wheel-drive
- Platform: Ford T3
- Related: Ford F-Series (fourteenth generation)

Powertrain
- Electric motor: Dual permanent magnet motors
- Power output: 452 hp (337 kW; 458 PS) (standard battery); 580 hp (433 kW; 588 PS) (extended battery)
- Battery: 98.0 or 131.0 kWh (usable/net for both) lithium-ion
- Electric range: 240 mi (390 km) (standard range); 320 mi (510 km) (extended range); 300 mi (480 km) (Platinum trim)
- Plug-in charging: 155 kW (officially; 175 kW actual) DC; 11.3 or 19.2 kW AC (single 48-amp or dual 40-amp onboard charger); V2L: 9.6 kW

Dimensions
- Wheelbase: 3,696 mm (145.5 in)
- Length: 5,911 mm (232.7 in)
- Width: 2,032 mm (80.0 in)
- Height: 1,989 mm (78.3 in)
- Curb weight: 2,728–3,127 kg (6,015–6,893 lb)

The Ford F-150 Lightning is a battery electric light duty full-size pickup truck unveiled by the Ford Motor Company in May 2021 as part of the fourteenth generation Ford F-Series. Four models have been announced, and all models initially will be dual-motor, four-wheel-drive, with EPA range estimates of 240–320 mi (390–510 km). A commercial-grade version of the all-wheel drive (AWD) truck is sold in the United States, with higher-power/trim/range models also sold. The F-150 Lightning began production on April 26, 2022. In December 2025, Ford announced that they would stop manufacturing the F-150 Lightning.

== History ==
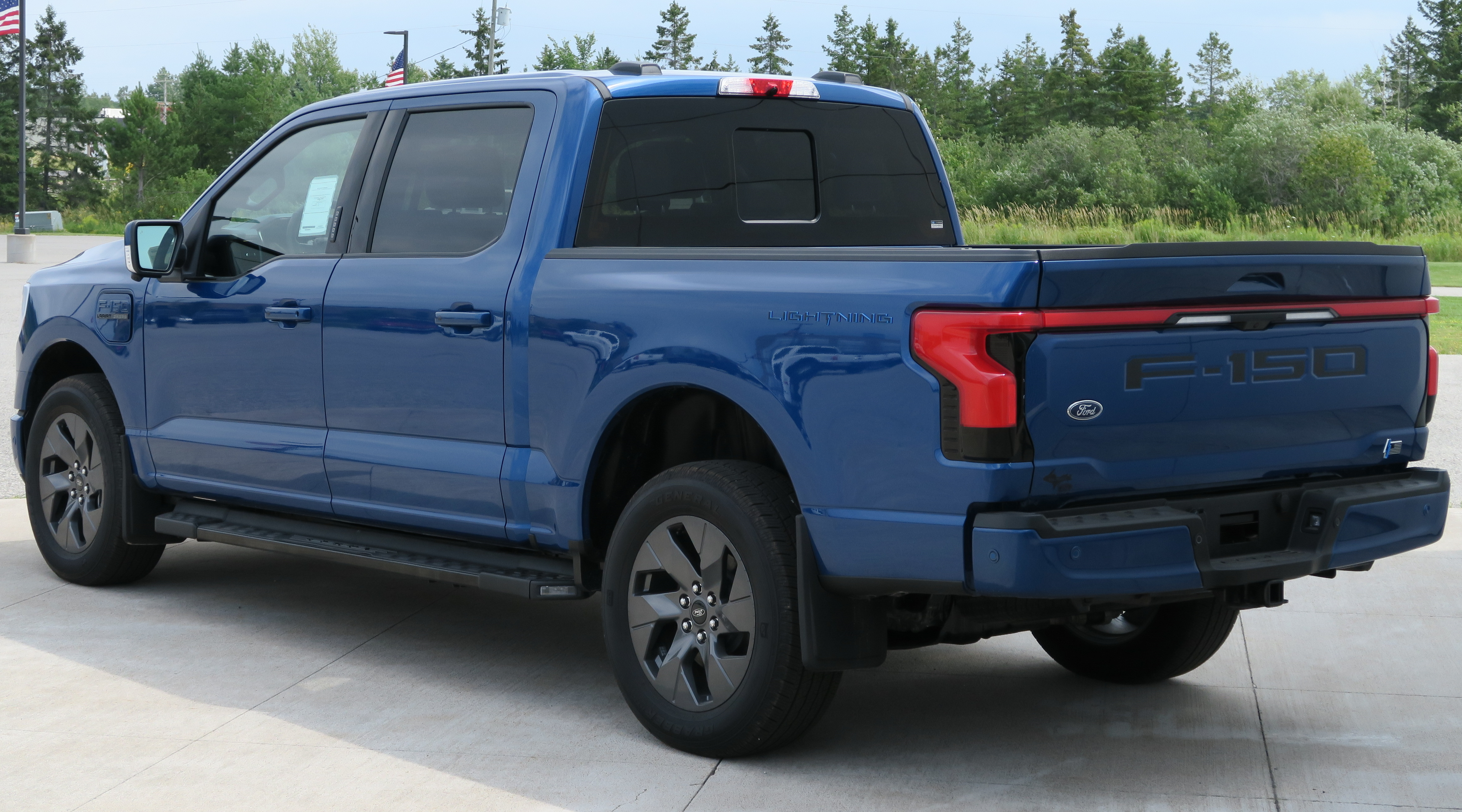
Rear view

In January 2019, Ford announced the intention to produce a fully-electric light pickup at the 2019 Detroit Auto Show.

In July 2019, Ford tested prototype electric test mules on existing F-150 chassis. This culminated in a record-setting demonstration test tow of 1,250,000 pounds (570,000 kg) on rails. Chief engineer for the F-150, Linda Zhang, emphasized at the time that Ford intended to take the "built Ford tough [characteristics of] durability, capability, and productivity and [extend that into] a whole new arena" of electric trucks.

Ford unveiled the truck, and released the model name on May 19, 2021, with production planned for spring of 2022.

Ford received 69,500 refundable-deposit orders in the first four days after the announcement. with more than 100,000 reservations by June 11, 2021, less than a month following the unveiling. Ford also announced then that the company would offer digital services for subscription revenue that will change car sales from a single-time transaction process. By the end of 2021, Ford had received more than 200,000 Lightning reservations, a projected 3-year backlog at planned production rates. As of June 2022, demand was strong for early deliveries, with one dealer offering a used 2022 Ford F-150 Lightning Platinum at $100,000 above the base price for the model.

By late May 2021, Ford had begun discussing other electric trucks beyond the F-series, such as the Expedition and Navigator, which were then intended to be underpinned by their full-size EV truck chassis, as well as a smaller chassis which will be used for the Bronco, Explorer, and Aviator.

The first pickup was manufactured on April 18, 2022, with first delivery on May 26. In June 2022, Ford announced its intention to restructure its dealership model, including building an e-commerce platform where customers can buy EVs at non-negotiable prices in an effort to match Tesla’s profit margins. Ford also stated in June 2022 that it planned to spend $3.7 billion to hire 6,200 union workers to staff several assembly plants in Michigan, Ohio and Missouri in a bid to sell 2 million EVs a year by 2026. In the event, they missed the target, failing to turn a profit on Lightning production, and Ford halted Lightning production before 2026.

In May 2023, Ford announced integration of the North American Charging System (NACS) into their electric vehicles. New built Ford electrics after 2024 would have native NACS charge ports on the vehicle. Existing Ford electric models were also to be able to connect to the NACS system and its chargers by use of an adapter. Both will thus have access to the extensive NACS charging network with more than 12,000 chargers in North America. In 2023, the F-150 Lightning was reportedly ready to launch in Iceland, Norway, and South Africa in late 2023, and Australasia in Early 2024 alongside the Mustang Mach-E.

In December 2025, Ford announced that it would stop manufacturing the F-150 Lightning due to a failure to earn a profit. With the announcement, Ford said it remained "on track to produce a $30,000 EV pickup for sale by 2027, which the company says will be the first in a new string of low-cost EVs." This vehicle was announced in August 2026 as the Ford Fathom, with orders and deliveries expected in 2027.

== Overview ==
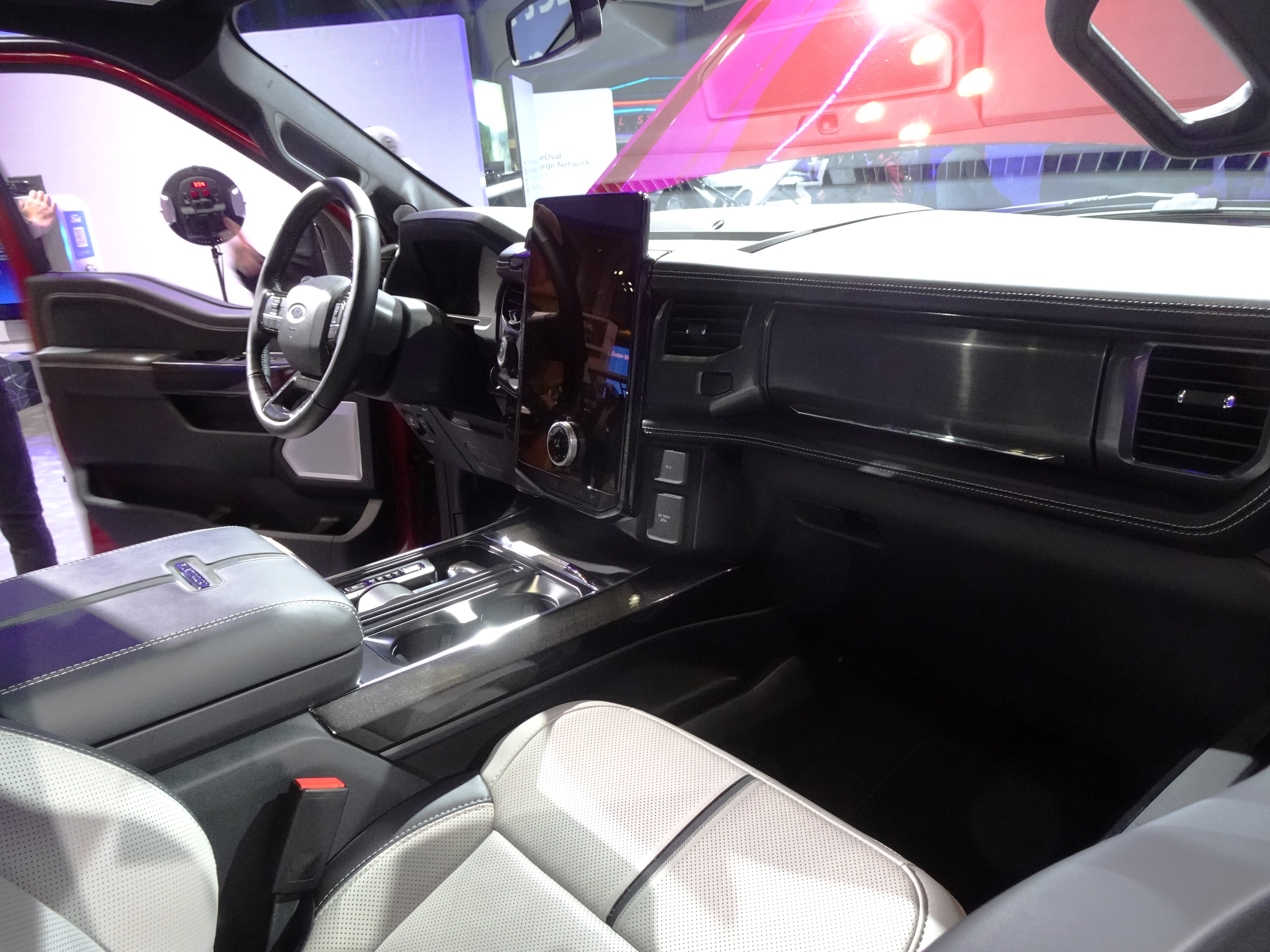
Interior, Ford F-150 Lightning Platinum (2024).

The base configuration has 452 hp (337 kW), 230 mi (370 km) range, and its smaller battery supports a 2,000 lb (910 kg) payload. The high-end configuration has 580 hp (430 kW), 300 mi (480 km) EPA range, 0–60 mph (0–97 km/h) times in the mid-four-second range, and a towing capacity of 10,000 lb (4,500 kg). All models have 775 lb⋅ft (1,051 N⋅m) of torque, full-time 4wd, independent rear suspension, and will initially come in a crew-cab configuration only, with a 5.5 ft (1.7 m) bed. The F-150 Lightning has an overall length of 19 ft 5 in (5.91 m), with a 12 ft 2 in (3.70 m) wheelbase. It weighs 6,015 to 6,893 pounds (2,728 to 3,127 kg) depending on model and trim, up to 35% more than the internal-combustion-engine (ICE) powered equivalent F-150, with most of the additional weight a result of the Lightning's 1,800-pound (820 kg) battery. The F-150 Lightning was one of several electric vehicles cited by National Transportation Safety Board head Jennifer Homendy as being significantly heavier than ICE-powered models and thus raising the risk of other road users being killed or seriously injured in collisions, alongside products from other manufacturers such as General Motors and Volvo. The active suspension provides real-time load weighing function.

Like Tesla, the Ford F-150 Lightning is announced to include over-the-air software updates, and a significant software driving aid which will allow limited hands-off highway driving, but fall short of full self-driving. The F-150 Lightning in some trim packages, in concert with the "80A Ford Charge Station pro with Ford Intelligent Backup Power capability," can provide household-oriented V2G power, which can meet the electrical needs of a typical American home for three to ten days. The truck can also supply up to 9.6 kW of power through up to eleven 120V and 240V electrical outlets distributed around the truck. Those outlets can be used to charge other vehicles or itself.

This electric truck has a standard battery and can travel 230 mi (370 km) on a single charge. EPA range estimates of 230–300 mi (370–480 km) produced by Ford in May 2021 were based on 1,000 lb (450 kg) of cargo carried in the truck. Electrek reported that the range with no load, just a driver and the truck, appeared to be closer to 400 mi (640 km).

The Ford F-150 Lightning was also evaluated to reach 62 mph (100 km/h) in 4.5 seconds. Maximum available payload is 2,235 pounds (1,014 kg), which includes the 400-pound (180 kg) payload of the "frunk" (which was Ford's interpretation of the front trunk). The new Lightning can tow up to 10,000 pounds (4,500 kg).

The base model is the "commercial-grade Lightning Pro" fleet version while the "mid-series" model is called the XLT. Higher-priced models are known as the Lariat and Platinum.

In MotorTrend testing of an F-150 Lightning Platinum without a trailer and only the driver, the Platinum attained a range of 255 miles (410 km). When towing a 7,218-pound (3,274 kg), 33 ft 11 in (10.34 m) camper, the F-150 Platinum was only able to reach 90 miles (140 km). The test was over an 80-mile (130 km) route with average highway speeds between 64 and 67 mph (103 and 108 km/h), and with the headlights and audio system on and the automatic climate control set to 72 °F (22 °C).

The F-150 Lightning is produced at the new Ford Rouge Electric Vehicle Center in Michigan, and involves two other plants: the Van Dyke Electric Powertrain Center in Sterling Heights, Michigan which will assemble the electric motors and the Rawsonville Components Plant in Ypsilanti, Michigan will produce the batteries.

=== Trim levels ===
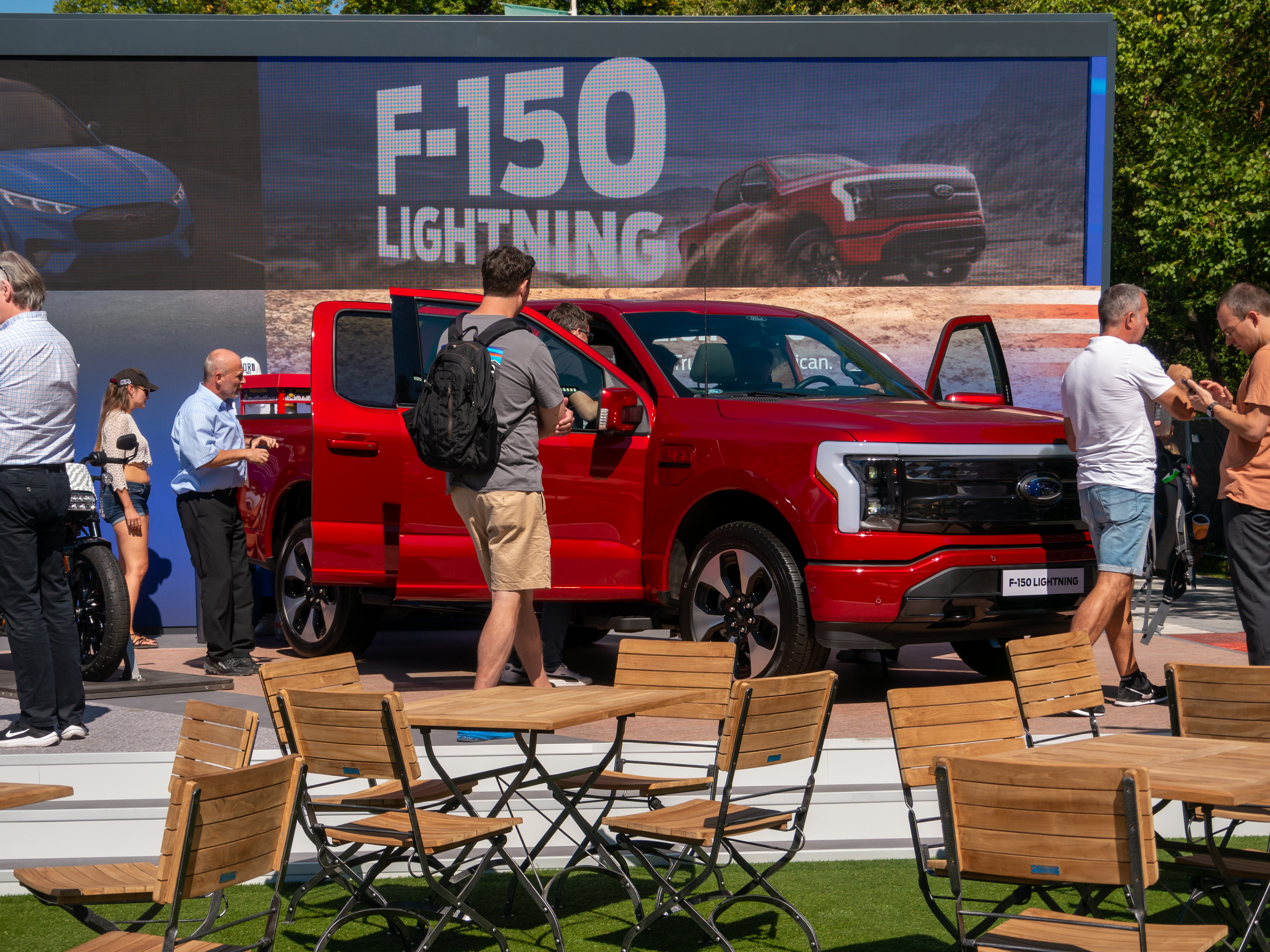
On display at IAA Open Space 2023 in Munich as the vehicle expands in Europe.

For the 2022 model year, the F-150 Lightning was available in four trim levels: Pro, XLT, Lariat, and Platinum. The Pro trim was only available with the smaller-capacity battery, and the Platinum was offered only with the higher-capacity battery, although all other trims include the smaller-capacity battery as standard equipment, but also offer the higher-capacity battery as an option.

=== Europe ===
Starting in April 2023, the Ford F-150 Lightning is officially sold in Europe, with the first market being Norway. In the country, it is only offered in the Lariat Launch Edition version, featuring a Super Crew Cab body style and available exclusively in Antimatter Blue.

== Awards ==
- 2023 North American Truck of the Year
- 2023 MotorTrend Truck of the Year
- 2023 Kelley Blue Book Best Buy Awards for Electric Truck
- 2023 Edmunds Top Rated Electric Truck
- 2024 Edmunds Top Rated EV Truck

== Sales ==
In 2022, Ford sold 15,617 units of the F-150 Lightning. In the first quarter of 2023, it was 7085 units and in the second quarter, 4466 units. In Q3 2023, 3503 units were sold. The final quarter of 2023 had 11,905 sales, giving a 2023 total of 24,165 units. As a result of lower sales expectations, Ford halved its 2024 production plans from roughly 3200 weekly units to around 1600 weekly units.

Sales Result
| Year | USA |
|---|---|
| 2022 | 15,617 |
| 2023 | 24,165 |
| 2024 | 33,510 |
| 2025 | 27,307 |

== Motorsports ==
A modified Ford F-150 Lightning EV competed in the 2024 Pikes Peak International Hill Climb, where it won the event, with a 8:53.553.
