= Linda Zhang =

Automotive engineer

- Education: University of Michigan
- Occupation: Automotive Engineer
- Employer: Ford
- Known for: Ford F-150 Lightning
- Title: Chief Engineer

Linda Zhang is an automotive engineer. She is currently the chief engineer for the Ford F-150 Lightning all-electric pickup truck.

== Early life and education ==
Zhang's family immigrated to the United States when she was eight years old. She cites her father's work as a researcher for Ford as inspiration for her later career.

Zhang majored in electrical engineering at the University of Michigan, graduating in 1996. In 1998 she earned an MBA from the University of Michigan, followed by a master's degree in 2011 in computer engineering also from the University of Michigan.

== Career ==
Zhang began her career at Ford in 1996 at the age of 19. As an electrical engineer, Zhang worked on the Ford Explorer and the Ford Escape, as well as powertrains for multiple Ford models. Zhang was part of Ford's research and strategy into an all-electric vehicle. In September 2018, she became the chief engineer for Ford's all-electric pickup truck, the F-150 Lightning. Zhang focused on both the engineering challenges and the strategic challenges in building an electric truck that can compete with a gasoline powered engine, saying: "There was a lot of skepticism around whether EV trucks can really be tough." President Biden took a test drive of the Lightning in May 2021, stating that he was impressed with the truck and Zhang's work. The truck was launched in May 2021.

== Honors and recognition ==
- 2021, named a Rising Star by Automotive News
- 2021, featured on the November cover of Time Magazine for her work on the F-150 Lightning
- 2022, named one of USA Today's Women of the Year, which recognizes women who have made a significant impact
