= Eva Fong Chang =

American painter

Eva Fong Chan (1897–1991) was a Chinese and Native American painter who was one of the first Asian American women to widely exhibit in the United States.

Chan was born in Sacramento, California on April 1, 1897, and was the second of thirteen children. She got involved in art in high school and won an art competition and had her work featured on a line of Christmas cards. During this time she also won the Bay Area's first Miss Chinatown USA pageant and begin to learn to play the piano.

She attended Sacramento Junior College, but did not graduate. Later, in 1930 she returned to school at the California School of Fine Arts. Her most productive painting period was during the 1930s and she exhibited at many museums. She worked in oil painting and watercolor painting.

With the birth of her first child in 1940 her productivity as a painter declined. She maintained a career as a piano teacher.
