= Feiping Chang =

Taiwanese socialite, blogger, and fashion influencer

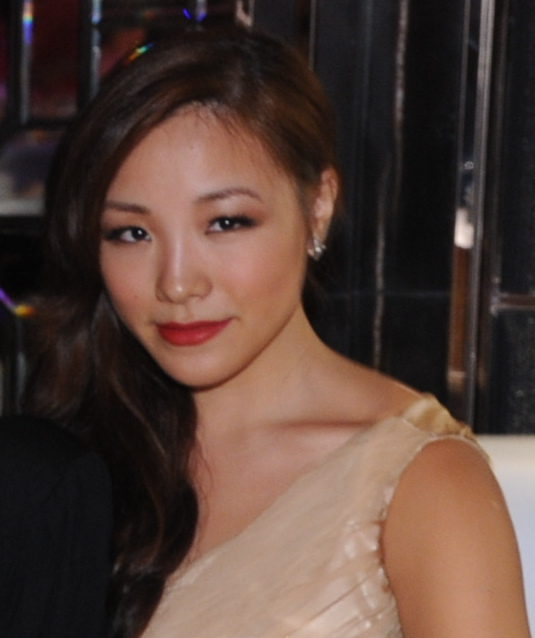
- Chang in 2011
- Born: Taipei, Taiwan
- Education: New York University
- Occupations: socialite fashion blogger
- Spouse: Lincoln Li (m. 2017)

Feiping Chang (traditional Chinese: 張翡玶; simplified Chinese: 张翡玶; pinyin: Zhāng Fěipíng) is a Taiwanese fashion influencer based in Hong Kong.

== Early life ==
Feiping Chang was born in Taipei and grew up in Sydney and Singapore before settling in Hong Kong. She graduated from New York University's Stern School of Business.

== Career ==
Chang worked in finance and banking in Hong Kong before launching her lifestyle blog, xoxoFei.com.

== Personal life ==
In 2014, Chang met financier Lincoln Li through mutual friend Ivan Pun while they were in Myanmar. Two years later, Li proposed to Chang at the Huka Lodge in Taupō. The couple were married legally in April 2017, but had their wedding festivities in June 2017. Their wedding festivities lasted three days, starting with a dinner in Capri on June 15. On June 17 the couple's wedding ceremony took place at Villa Lysis. The Italian government had never permitted a wedding to take place at Villa Lysis, making Chang and Li the first two people to wed there. The government agreed to the ceremony at Villa Lysis after Chang and Li offered to refurbish it prior to their ceremony.
