= Zhang Wenhao =

Zhang Wenhao (Chinese: 张文浩; born 1964), also known as Wen-Hao Zhang, is a Chinese plant physiologist and nutritionist at the Institute of Botany, Chinese Academy of Sciences.

== Career ==
In 1991, Zhang and Stephen Tyerman studied sodium azide and concluded that by combining it with oxygen and using both on the hydraulic conductivity of the cell cortex will increase volumes of pressure relaxation.

In 1999 he and Tyerman studied Triticum aestivum and how mercuric chloride effects on hydraulic conductivity in that plant. During the experiment it was revealed that the inhibition of $Lp$ and depolarization of $Vm$ which is caused by $HgCl2$ was similar to hypoxia.

In 2001 he, Tyerman, and Peter Ryan have studied the same species again and how malic acid which is found on the tip or extreme end of a root is tolerant against aluminum. During the same study he also discovered that when Al_{3+} is activated its permeability is higher than malate_{2−} and contained anion channel antagonists such as niflumate and diphenylamine-2-carboxylic acid.

In 2009 he along with Chinese colleagues studied nitric oxide in combination with nitrate reductase in both cold and freezing temperature on a plant species called Arabidopsis thaliana. He discovered that when combining this with both _{nia1nia2} and nitric oxide associated leaves the cold doesn't bother the plants as much, but it does bother its seedings. He also discovered proline in wild plants and used nitrate reductase inhibitor with nitric oxide scavenger and donor to prove that there is positive correlation between them when it comes to freezing temperature.

In June 2010 he along with American and Japanese colleagues had studied acid soils and discovered that certain species of crop plants are resistant to soluble aluminium. The way how they do, he explained, is that the genes of ALMT and MATE families encode membrane proteins which produce anion efflux called TaALMT1 across the cell membrane.
