= Ningbo University of Technology =

University in Ningbo, China

Coordinates: 29.8150°N 121.5728°E

- 宁波工程学院
- Former name: Ningbo College
- Type: Public
- Established: 1983
- Location: Ningbo, Zhejiang, China
- Website: nbut.edu.cn

Ningbo University of Technology (Chinese: 宁波工程学院; pinyin: Níngbō Gōngchéng Xuéyuàn) is a comprehensive provincial university located in Ningbo, Zhejiang province of the People's Republic of China.

== Location ==
The university covers an area of 428,015.77 square meters, of which 204,000 square meters consist of buildings space. A new campus is being built and that covers an area of 914,791.894 square meters.

It is currently in Jiangbei District.

It was formerly in Haishu District.

== History ==
The university was established in 1983 as Ningbo College. In 1997, the university was approved by the Chinese Education Ministry to receive the status of National Exemplary Engineering College.

It also gained further accreditation by the Ministry of Education in 2004 as a full-time university providing four-year undergraduate programmes. Presently the university has a faculty of approximately 700 staff. This include 41 professors and 133 associate professors. There is approximately 8000 full-time students.

== Related Incident ==
- Murder of Chen Shijun
