= Zhang Renxi =

17th-century Chinese poetical critic

Zhang Renxi (Chinese: 張仁熙, styled Zhangren 張人) was a noted Chinese poetical critic, who flourished in the 17th century. He was the author of the Ouwanji (藕湾集), a collection of essays, and also of a treatise on inks, dated 1671.
