= Murder of Chen Shijun =

2021 murder of college student

Murder of Chen Shijun (June 14 Foreign-Related Criminal Case)
- Date: 2021-06-14
- Time: 22:00 (Beijing time)
- Location: Ningbo, Zhejiang, China; 29°51′37″N 121°37′28″E
- Type: Stabbing
- Motive: Relationship dispute
- Target: Chen Shijun
- Deaths: 1
- Convicted: Shadeed Abdulmateen
- Charges: Murder
- Verdict: Guilty
- Sentence: Death

The murder of Chen Shijun (Chinese: 陈施君遇害案), officially called "June 14 Foreign-Related Criminal Case" (Chinese: “6·14”涉外刑事案件) is an intentional homicide case in Ningbo, China.

On the night of June 14, 2021, Chen Shijun, a 23-year-old female college student from the same university, was raped and stabbed to death in a grove of trees alongside the Shiji Avenue, Yinzhou District, Ningbo. In the early hours of June 15, police arrested a suspect Shadeed Abdulmateen, an American citizen who was an English teacher at the Ningbo University of Technology who told the police that the reason for the killing was due to a "relationship dispute" with him and the victim.

The case has stirred up a wave of anti-foreigner sentiments in China and has triggered a lot of discussions on Chinese social media about the issue of "super-national treatment" – e.g. granting leniency in sentencing to crimes committed by foreigners.

On August 20, the Ningbo People's Procuratorate filed an indictment against the perpetrator to the Ningbo Intermediate People's Court for the crime of intentional homicide. On 21 April 2022, Abdulmateen was found guilty of murder and sentenced to death.

== Background ==
External videos
- Self-introduction video of the suspect

According to his self-introduction video, Shadeed Abdulmateen was born in the 1960s in Los Angeles, United States. He received an associate degree in human resources from the University of Phoenix. Before coming to China, he was a salesman selling mobile phones and other communication equipment.

He was married to a Chinese woman and has a son. He was divorced before the incident. The suspect once showed on social media that his contract was expired in 2019. He had screenshots of the chat with Lily Liu (劉林林), the director of International Exchange College (IEC), Ningbo University of Technology, about the contract renewal In the conversation, Lily Liu insisted to let the suspect stay ("他必須留下來"). After this incident, Ningbo University of Technology was accused of enabling the misconduct of foreign teachers.

Lily Liu published an article titled "Exploration of Management of Foreign Teachers in Universities from the Perspective of Cross-Cultural Exchange" 《跨文化交際視角下高校外教管理探索》in 2014, which claimed that if foreign teachers asked girls about the color of their underwear is not sexual harassment, but cultural differences between China and the West.

== Reaction ==
This murder case triggered a heated discussion on the Chinese internet. The Chinese public also urged the authorities to seek justice for the victim and not show leniency on Abdulmateen on the basis that he is a foreigner.

After the incident, the victim's family offered to go to the school to retrieve the victim's belongings, but the school refused. They said that this would be a "bad influence for the school." On June 18, the family members went to the school but were stopped by the school and the police. The school said that "the incident happened outside the school and has nothing to do with us." In addition, the Ningbo University of Technology is suspected of conducting online censorship with the officials, removing messages posted by family members on Sina Weibo. Some comments and videos related to this murder case on Chinese internet were also removed.

On June 18, the editor-in-chief of the Chinese Communist Party-owned tabloid Global Times Hu Xijin said on Weibo that, "The public opinion should avoid focusing on the criminal suspect’s nationality and skin color, as this may cause international backlash."

== Trial ==
On July 23, 2021, the investigation of the homicide was completed and transferred it to the Ningbo People's Procuratorate. On August 20, the Ningbo People's Procuratorate filed an indictment against the perpetrator to the Ningbo Intermediate People's Court for the crime of intentional homicide. The prosecutor said that the evidence is sufficient and the suspect would be held accountable. On November 25, the case was heard by Intermediate People's Court of Ningbo. During the trial at the Ningbo Intermediate People's Court, both the public prosecution department and the defense counsel presented evidence and the court hired an interpreter for the defendant. The officials from the US Consulate General in Shanghai attended the hearing. At the end of the trial, the court announced an adjournment and the verdict will be announced at a later date.

On April 21, 2022, the Ningbo People's Intermediate Court found Abdulmateen guilty of intentional murder and sentenced him to death. The court found that Abdul Mateen had done the killing with premeditation and his motive was to seek revenge on Chen, which led to her brutal death, and due to the aggravating factors of the case, the court decided to impose a death sentence on Abdulmateen.

== See also ==
- Shen Chong case
- Controversy over study buddies for international students in China
