= James X. Zhang =

Academic work
- Discipline: Health economy
- Institutions: University of Chicago

James X. Zhang is an American health economist and health services researcher at the University of Chicago known for his innovative approaches in exploring complex data to measure a range of factors influencing healthcare delivery and outcomes.

Zhang initially worked with Nicholas Christakis, and the products included a novel methodology for identifying married couples in the Medicare claims to study mortality, morbidity, and health care use among the married elderly, and a novel claims-based dataset exploiting substantial cross-set linkages to study end-of-life care.

Zhang's research addressed the significance of comorbidity in clinical setting, and was among the most frequently cited papers in the field. His contributions have also included some other influential studies in the field of Medicare Part D program, and generic drug use. His more recent contributions with David O. Meltzer includes a novel method identifying patients with cost-related medication non-adherence using a big-data approach. His most recent contribution aims to advance the understanding of the role of age advancement in health-related behavioral changes and the longitudinal aspects of such behavioral changes before and during the COVID-19 pandemic, and the differential rates of such behaviors between men and women.

Zhang has also contributed to the advancement of understanding regarding patterns of concentration in healthcare spending and in drug utilization. He showed that the concentration of healthcare spending is present even in patient populations with the same high-cost condition, such as heart failure, and that varying comorbidities are one substantive contributor to such concentration. He has also shown that, regarding the relationship between market mechanisms and drug prices, the observed positive relationship between the decreasing utilization of brand-name drugs and their increased prices can be explained in part by increases in market concentration of the brand-name drugs, despite competition from generic drugs.

In addition, Zhang has made contributions that advance the understanding of the role of health insurance with respect to quality of and access to care among older patients with diabetes (a high-cost, high-resource-utilization patient population). His research demonstrated that insurance plays a more variable and nuanced role than commonly thought. He showed that while those without insurance are the least likely to meet quality-of-care measures, provision of health insurance such as Medicaid alone is not necessarily sufficient for the delivery of high-quality care. More recently, he showed that while generous insurance coverage such as dual Medicare-Medicaid coverage enables patients to overcome major deficiencies in income, such coverage is not sufficient to prevent patients from falling through the cracks as their disease progresses. Patients' ability to evaluate the value of healthcare may be hindered by non-economic factors such as mental health; hence, health policy addressing drug affordability and access barriers needs to be implemented in tandem with clinical intervention. To bridge the gap in financing for cell and gene therapies, which often have high single-therapy and upfront costs and uncertain long-term benefits, he proposed a value-based mixed-financing mechanism to integrate public and private insurances by allowing buy-ins by private insurance to a public special fund.

Beyond econometric and statistical approaches, Zhang has contributed to the health sciences by introducing and applying machine-learning techniques to prognostic modeling for patients with lung cancer. His research showed that, while the traditional statistical approach and machine-learning approach have similar performance in identifying the most important predictive variables, the order of variable importance is more robust in the machine-learning model than in traditional statistical models regarding the differential functional forms of the variables.
