= Lifen Zhang =

Chinese journalist (born 1962)

Lifen Zhang (born in 1962) is a Chinese journalist, author and broadcaster.

== Biography ==
Born in Shanghai, China, Lifen received his BA degree in journalism (1984) at Fudan University, Shanghai, where he had also taught for a few years. He came to Britain to pursue postgraduate studies in 1988 on winning the Sino-British Friendship Scholarship; then obtained his PhD in Mass Communications (1994) at University of Leicester, England. His first book, Wondering by the End of Century (co-authored) was published in 1988.

Upon completing his doctorate, Lifen worked for 10 years at the BBC as assistant producer for TV, producer, senior producer, presenter, news/current affairs editor and senior journalism-production trainer for the BBC World Service.

Lifen Zhang is associate editor, Financial Times, and founding editor for FTChinese.com, FT's Chinese language website. He is also founding editor and editor-in-chief for FTRui (FT's Chinese-language lifestyle and wealth management magazine).

Lifen was a visiting scholar at Department of Journalism, the National Chengchi University, Taipei, in 2003. He is also member of the International Advisory Committee for Department of Journalism, Hong Kong Baptist University.

In early 2010, Lifen is visiting professor at Dept of Journalism, Hong Kong Baptist University.

He sits on the executive committee of the Great Britain-China Centre (GBCC) based in London.

Also, he is on the advisory board of OMFIF where he is regularly involved in meetings regarding the financial and monetary system.

== Awards ==
He has received various journalism awards including a National Reportage Prize in China in 1988 and the BBC Onassis Travel Award in 2001.
