= Cheong Chia Chieh =

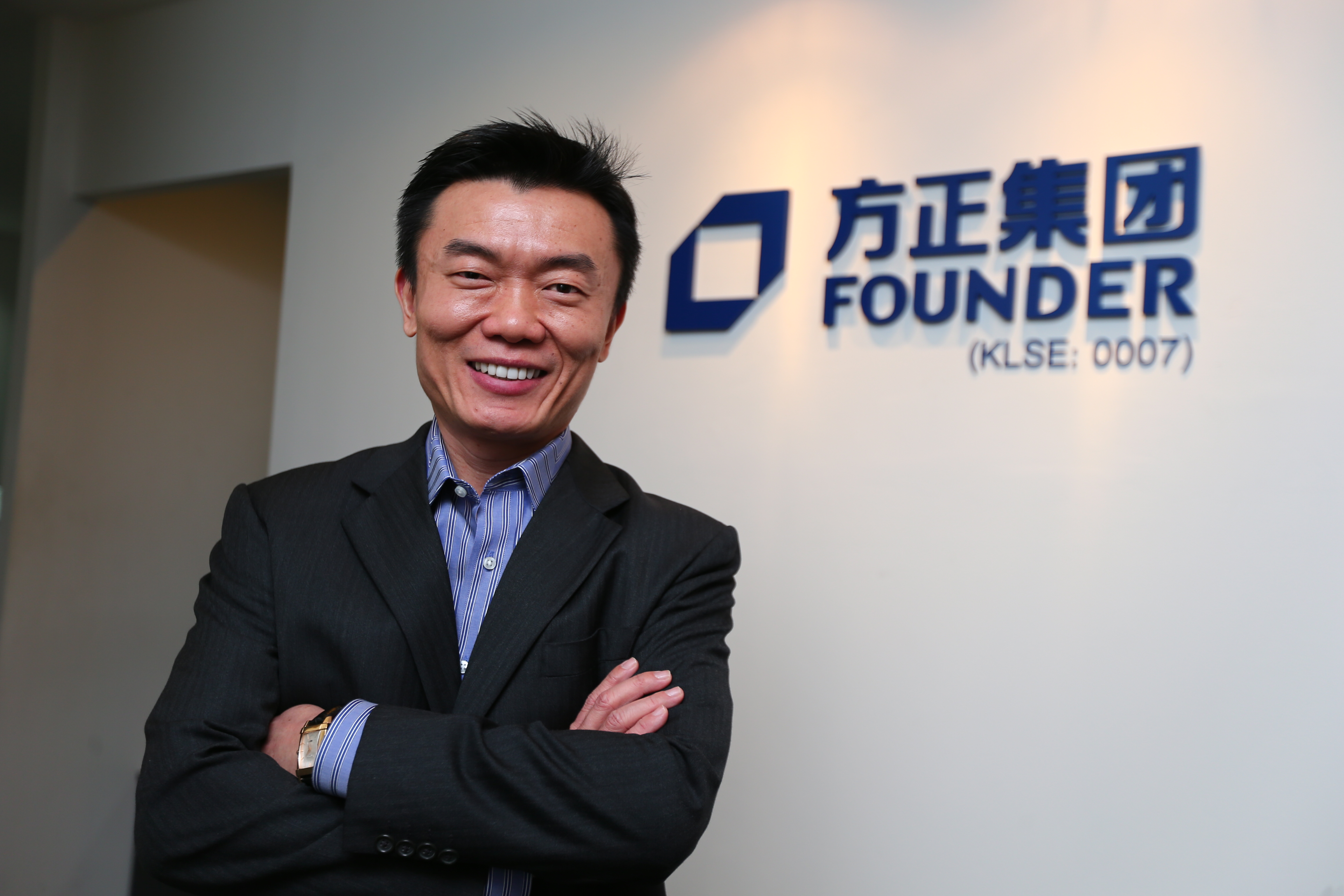
- Cheong Chia Chieh - Group Managing Director - PUC Founder (MSC) Bhd
- Born: Cheong Chia Chieh c. 1972; Ipoh, Perak, Malaysia
- Died: 27 February 2016

Cheong Chia Chieh (simplified Chinese: 张家榤; traditional Chinese: 張家榤; pinyin: Zhāng Jiājié; c. 1972–2016) was the group managing director of PUC Founder (MSC) Berhad (KLSE: 0007) – a listed company under ACE market of Bursa Malaysia – principally engaged in the Technology, Media and Telecommunication sector ("TMT"), Mobile Application sector, and Renewable Energy sector. He was the Former Managing Director of Red-hot Media International Limited (“RHM”) with the primary role of being responsible for its overall operations within the RHM group of companies, sales as well as strategic direction and vision for the group. He was a founding director of the RH Media Group, and also a board member of a number of RHM's subsidiaries, including being the sole director of Red Media Asia Ltd.

RMH Group grew under his leadership, and the major cities in China which includes Shanghai, Beijing, and Guangzhou. RedHot's unique business model also attracted investors from all around starting with leading institutional investment agencies of the Malaysian government Ministry of Finance to foreign investors such as Good Morning Shinhan Securities Co. Ltd now known as Shinhan Investment Corp.

Within a year Cheong served as group managing director, PUCF had been introduced with new board of directors and new management team. The company market value has increased from RM24,230,000 (as at 27/12/2013) to RM 167,310,000 (as at 22/12/2014). Due to its financial performance, PUCF had distributed bonus share and free warrants to its shareholders. In 2005, he ventured into industries such as renewable energy sector, e-payment services and development of mobile applications.

== Biography ==
=== Education ===
Born in Ipoh, Malaysia, he held a Masters in Business Administration from the California University since 2001. Throughout his entire schooling and university experience, he was already an entrepreneur involving in the computer and devices trading business. As old sayings goes, life is a never ending learning process. Cheong was enrolled into China Peking University for an EMBA course and had also been enrolled to the Diploma of Advanced Studies in Renewable Energy Management Programme in the University of St. Gallen in Switzerland, which was an effort he has made to better enhance the knowledge on the management of energy businesses.

=== Background ===
From 1996 to 1999, he was a committee member of the Selangor Economic Action Council where he was involved in promoting investments and industry development opportunities in the Selangor state.

In year 1998 to 1999, he was appointed as a Consultant of Nanyang Press Holdings Berhad (“NPHB”). From 2000 to 2006, he was the chief executive officer for Nanyang Online Sdn Bhd (“Nanyang Online”), a subsidiary of NPHB which is involved in the internet and e-commerce industry. From 2005 to 2006, he was appointed as Strategic Investment Consultant of NPHB and was also the chairman of the Group Marketing Committee as well as an Executive Committee Member of the Group Circulation Committee of NPHB that oversees and manages the NPHB group's advertising sales and distribution for its publications. During his tenure at NPHB, Nanyang Online established the Ax Change business model. In 2004, he led a management buy-out of the Ax Change business model from Nanyang Online via the incorporation of Red-hot Media Sdn Bhd. Subsequently, RHM and its subsidiaries were formed in 2007, followed by RHM's listing on the AIM Market in September 2008.

In 2009, he was awarded The World Chinese Young Entrepreneurs Award by the 6th World Summit of Chinese Entrepreneurs and The Emerging Category Award of Malaysia's Ernst & Young Entrepreneur of the Year® 2009.

In April 2012, RHM was awarded “The Globalization Business Development Business Awards” by Malaysian Venture Capital & Private Equity Association. According to Allenby Capital Limited's AIM Asia Market quarterly Report 2012, RHM was also the Most Traded Asia Media Stock in AIM market, London Stock Exchange for 2 quarters continually. The “RHM Interactive Media” project was strongly supported by the Malaysia Science, Technology and Innovation Department through ‘Techno fund’.

Cheong Chia Chieh was also a member of the [www.apec.org/ APEC].

His portfolio includes holding prestigious positions in various associations such as Secretary General for Inter Varsity Council, and is the founder of the Malaysia Electronic Trade Association. As a reputable and prominent figure, he has been invited as a speaker for various notable global and regional industry events such as IFRA in 2006 and the APEC Youth Economic Leaders Summit 2008.

In 2013, Cheong was proudly appointed as the Tourism Ambassador of [www.myanmar.travel/ Myanmar Tourism Federation] International Division. This involvement fostered better international relations between Malaysia and Myanmar.

On 15 Oct 2014, PUCF had been awarded with Sin Chew Business Excellence Award in recognition of its outstanding performance in service and product quality.

Over the past 20 years, Cheong's business acumen has assisted him with his endeavours to be an entrepreneur across the Malaysia and China region.

=== Cheong and PUC Founder (MSC) Berhad ===
Within a year from 1 Jan 2014, Cheong serving as group managing director, PUCF had been introduced with new board of directors and new management team. The company market value has increased from RM24,230,000 (as at 27/12/2013) to RM 167,310,000 (as at 22/12/2014). Due to its financial performance, PUCF had distributed 132,791,321 bonus share and 132,791,321 free warrants to its shareholders on the basis of one (1) bonus share and one (1) free warrant for every seven (7) existing Founder shares.

Year 2015 was a turning point for PUC Founder and Cheong, as he led PUC Founder (MSC) Berhad (KLSE:0007) into a Group transformation plan. In this plan, PUC Founder is venturing into industries such as renewable energy sector, e-payment services and development of mobile applications.

On 10 Mar 2015, PUCF wholly owned subsidiary Max Green Energy Sdn. Bhd. ("MESB") has been awarded as a Feed-in-Tariff Approval Holder by the Sustainable Energy Development Authority Malaysia to develop and operate a solar photovoltaic ("PV") plant with 1 megawatt power ("MWp") capacity in Sungai Petani, Kedah, to produce electricity to be supplied to Tenaga Nasional Berhad. Subsequent to that, it has brought positive feedback on market confidence as PUCF shares (stock code: 0007) together with its Warrant, PUC-WA (stock code: 0007WA) have both emerged in the list of top 10 most actively traded counters on Bursa Malaysia with a trading volume of 80.67million shares (PUC, 0007) and 30.96million units (PUC-WA, 0007WA).

On 9 June 2015, Cheong Chia Chieh also announced his 50 MW solar power plant plan in a press conference after the PUCF's 17th Annual General Meeting. He announced that PUC Founder intends to further expand its renewable energy business to become the Renewable Energy Project Owner, Engineering Procurement Construction Contractors (EPCC) and Domestic Distributor for equipment of renewable energy. Two weeks later, on 22 June, MESB has inked the power purchase agreement with Malaysia's National Grid, Tenaga Nasional Berhad (“TNB”). As stated in the contract, TNB would purchase electricity from PUCF for a period of 21 years.

=== Death ===
Cheong died from hemophagocytic lymphohistiocytosis on 27 February 2016. He was 44.
