= Zhang Tiesheng =

Chinese businessman

Zhang Tiesheng (Chinese: 张铁生; pinyin: Zhāng Tiěshēng; born 4 November 1950) is a Chinese businessman who became famous during the Cultural Revolution for refusing to take the national college entrance exam on physics and chemistry in 1973. Instead he handed in a blank paper and wrote on the back that he was disgusted by bookworms who had never done any honest work, and that a few hours of written exams would disqualify him. He became a national hero for his stand and even won a seat in the Standing Committee of the National People's Congress in 1975. However, after the fall of the Gang of Four he was put on trial and sentenced to 15 years in prison for opposing Deng Xiaoping's takeover of power and educational reforms.

He later founded the Wellhope Agri-Tech company. As of 2017, his net worth is 106 million RMB.
