= Ciani =

Ciani may refer to:

== People ==
- Antonio Ber Ciani (1907–2001), Argentine actor and film director
- Dino Ciani (1941–1974), Italian pianist
- Marco Ciani (born 1987), Guatemalan footballer
- Michaël Ciani (born 1984), French professional footballer
- Sergio Ciani or Alan Steel (1935–2015), Italian bodybuilder and actor
- Suzanne Ciani (born 1946), Italian American pianist and music composer
- Yolanda Ciani (1938–2023), Mexican actress

== Aircraft ==
- Ciani Crib or SSVV EC.41/64 Crib, a single seat, high performance glider designed and built in Italy in the 1960s
- Ciani Eventuale, an Italian glider sometimes known as the SSVV EC 40/62 Eventuale
- Ciani Spillo or SSVV EC.37/53 Spillo, a single seat competition glider designed and built in Italy in the 1950s
- Ciani Urendo, or SSVV EC 38/56 Urendo, an Italian tandem-seat training glider from the 1950s
- Ciani Uribel, a single seat sailplane designed and built in Italy in the late 1950s

== See also ==
- Chianina
- Chianni
- Chihani
- Cian
- Cianci
- Luciani
- Ucciani
- Varciani
