= Tiffany (given name) =

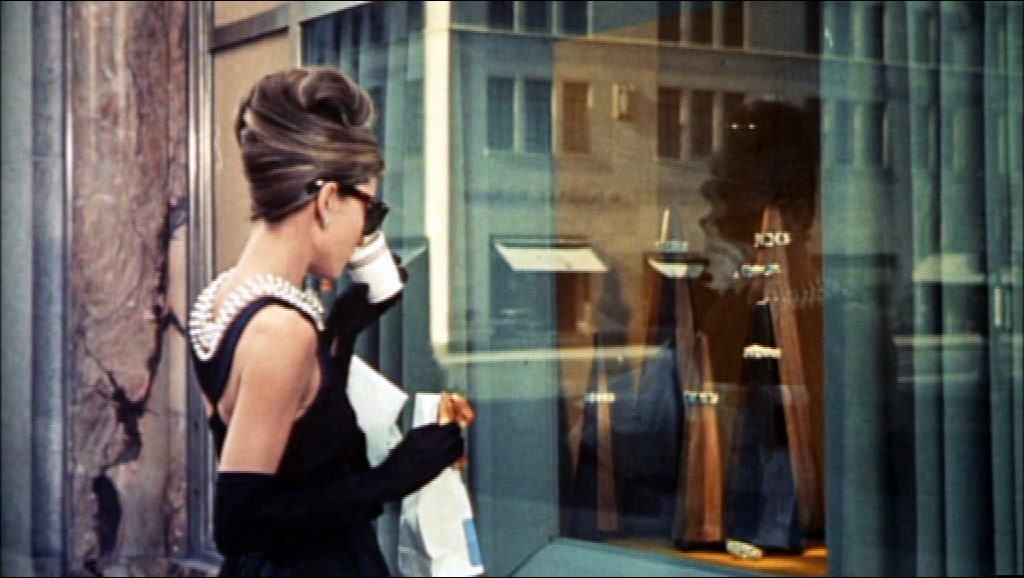
- Audrey Hepburn as Holly Golightly, looking in the window of Tiffany & Co., in the 1961 film Breakfast at Tiffany's, which is thought to have spawned the modern popularity of the name.
- Pronunciation: /ˈtɪfəni/
- Gender: Female

Origin
- Origin: Greek
- Meaning: from Θεοφάνεια, Theophania—"manifestation of God", "appearance of God"
- Region of origin: Greece

Tiffany /ˈtɪfəni/ is a primarily English feminine form of the Greek given name Theophania. It was formerly often given to children born on the feast of Theophania, that is, Epiphany. The equivalent Greek male name is Theophanes (Θεοφάνης), commonly shortened to Phanis (Φάνης) and the female is Theophania (Θεοφανία) or Theophano (Θεοφανώ), colloquially Phani (Φανή).

The name was popular in the United States from the 1970s to early 1990s. Between 1980 and 1991 the number of babies named Tiffany born each year exceeded 10,000, peaking at 18,361 in 1988. This popularity was spawned by the 1961 movie starring Audrey Hepburn, Breakfast at Tiffany's, referring to the jewelry company rather than the feast of Epiphany. It received a boost from the 1971 James Bond film Diamonds Are Forever, in which the character "Tiffany Case" had a significant role.

== Notable people with this name or its spelling variants ==
=== Tifanie ===
- Tifanie Christun (born 1972), American voice actress

=== Tifany ===
- Tifany Huot-Marchand (born 1994), French short track speed skater
- Tifany Roux (born 1997), French alpine ski racer

=== Tiff ===
- Tiff Bluemle, American politician
- Tiff Eden (born 1994), English rugby union player
- Tiff Jimber, American singer-songwriter
- Tiff Joy (born 1986), American gospel artist and musician
- Tiff Lacey (born 1965), English singer, songwriter, author, and painter
- Tiff Macklem (born 1961), Canadian economist and central banker
- Tiff Stevenson (born 1978), British comedian and actress

=== Tiffani ===
- Tiffani Faison, American celebrity chef and restaurateur
- Tiffani Johnson (born 1975), American former WNBA player
- Tiffani McReynolds (born 1991), American hurdler
- Tiffani Thiessen (born 1974), American actress
- Tiffani Wood (born 1977), Australian singer and songwriter, and past member of girl group Bardot

=== Tiffany ===
- Tiffany (American wrestler) (born 1985), better known by her birth name Taryn Terrell
- Tiffany (Mexican wrestler) (born 1973), Mexican professional wrestler
- Tiffany Alvord (born 1992), American singer-songwriter and actress
- Tiffany Andrade Roche (born 1989), Venezuelan model and pageant titleholder
- Tiffany Ann Hsu (born 1984), also known as Hsu Wei-ning, Taiwanese actress
- Tiffany Arbuckle Lee (born 1975), birth name of Plumb, American songwriter, recording artist, performer, and author
- Tiffany Atkinson (born 1972), British academic and poet
- Tiffany Barbuzano, South African actress
- Tiffany Bias (born 1992), Thai basketball player
- Tiffany Blackmon (born 1984), American sports reporter
- Tiffany Bolling (born 1947), American actress and singer
- Tiffany Boone (born 1987), American actress
- Tiffany Boshers (born 1982), American soccer player
- Tiffany Brar, Indian community service worker and social activist
- Tiffany Brissette (born 1974), American actress
- Tiffany Brooks, several people
- Tiffany Brymer (born 1981), American former tennis player
- Tiffany Cabán (born 1987), American lawyer and politician
- Tiffany Calver (born 1994), British radio DJ and presenter
- Tiffany Cameron (born 1991), Canadian-born Jamaican professional footballer
- Tiffany Chan (born 1993), Hong Kong golfer
- Tiffany Chen (born 1959), Hong Kong administrative film producer, agent, and investor
- Tiffany Cherry (born 1971), Australian sports broadcaster
- Tiffany Chin (born 1967), American figure skater
- Tiffany Chung (born 1969), Vietnamese American multimedia artist
- Tiffany Dawn Cianci (born 1981), American influencer
- Tiffany Clark, member of the AVN Hall of Fame
- Tiffany Clarke (born 1991), American-Jamaican basketball player
- Tiffany Cobb (born 1976), birth name of American R&B and soul singer Blu Cantrell
- Tiffany Cohen (born 1966), American former swimmer
- Tiffany Cole (born 1981), American convicted of kidnapping and first degree murder
- Tiffany Cornelius (born 1989), Luxembourgish tennis player
- Tiffany Coyne (born 1982), American model and dancer
- Tiffany Cromwell (born 1988), Australian road- and gravel cyclist
- Tiffany Cross (born 1979), American television personality, political analyst, and author
- Tiffany Dabek (born 1980), American former professional tennis player
- Tiffany Darwish (born 1971), American singer, songwriter, and actress known by her mononym "Tiffany"
- Tiffany Derry (born 1982), American celebrity chef and restaurateur
- Tiffany Drew, Canadian woman whom Canadian killer Robert Pickton was accused of murdering
- Tiffany Dupont (born 1981), American actress
- Tiffany Eliadis (born 1995), Australian soccer player
- Tiffany Espensen (born 1999), Chinese-born American television and film actress
- Tiffany Esposito (born 1987), American politician
- Tiffany Eunick, American girl whom American killer Lionel Tate murdered in 2001
- Tiffany Evans (born 1992), American singer and actress
- Tiffany Faʻaeʻe (born 1982), American rugby union player
- Tiffany Fallon (born 1974), American model
- Tiffany Field, American professor of pediatrics, psychology, and psychiatry
- Tiffany Flynn (born 1995), American athlete
- Tiffany Foster (born 1984), Canadian equestrian
- Tiffany Foxx (born 1979), American recording artist
- Tiffany Gauthier (born 1993), French former alpine ski racer
- Tiffany Géroudet (born 1986), Swiss fencer
- Tiffany Giardina (born 1993), birth name of Stalking Gia, American singer, songwriter, actress, model, and entrepreneur
- Tiffany Gooden (born 1975), American former ABL player
- Tiffany Gouché (born 1988), American singer, songwriter, and producer
- Tiffany Granath (born 1968), American actress and radio personality
- Tiffany Grant (born 1968), American voice actress and script writer
- Tiffany Haas (born 1983), American former softball player
- Tiffany Haddish (born 1979), American comedian and actress
- Tiffany Hayes (born 1989), American-Azerbaijani WNBA player
- Tiffany Helm (born 1964), American actress
- Tiffany Hendra (born 1971), American actress and television personality
- Tiffany Hines (born 1985), American actress
- Tiffany Ho (badminton) (born 1998), Australian badminton player
- Tiffany Holmes (born 1964), American new media artist and educator
- Tiffany Houghton (born 1993), American singer-songwriter
- Tiffany Hsiung, Canadian documentary filmmaker
- Tiffany Jackson, several people
- Tiffany James (born 1997), Jamaican athlete
- Tiffany Jana (born 1977), American businessperson and writer
- Tiffany Jenkins, British sociologist, cultural commentator, writer, editor, and academic
- Tiffany Joh (born 1986), American professional golfer
- Tiffany Keep (born 2000), South African professional racing cyclist
- Tiffany Kelly, American 2006 winner of Miss Massachusetts USA
- Tiffany Kruger (born 1987), South African sprint canoeist
- Tiffany Lam (born 1980), American former beauty queen
- Tiffany Lamb (born 1966), Australian model, actress, and TV presenter
- Tiffany Laufer, American film director, screenwriter, children's author, and photographer
- Tiffany Lawrence (born 1982), American former politician- and beauty pageant contestant
- Tiffany Lee Brown, American writer and artist
- Tiffany Leong (1985–2015), Malaysian actress, host, and model
- Tiffany Limos (born 1980), American actress
- Tiffany Lincoln (born 1985), Australian netball player
- Tiffany Lott-Hogan (born 1975), American Olympic athlete
- Tiffany Lynn Rowe (born 1979), American model and actress
- Tiffany Maher, American contestant on So You Think You Can Dance (American season 9)
- Tiffany Margaret Hall (born 1963), British software engineer
- Tiffany McCarty (born 1990), American soccer player
- Tiffany McDaniel (born 1985), American author
- Tiffany Michelle (born 1984), American professional poker player and TV presenter
- Tiffany Midge (born 1965), Native American poet, editor, and author
- Tiffany Million (born 1966), stage name of American former professional wrestler- and pornographic actress Sandra Lee Schwab
- Tiffany Mitchell (basketball) (born 1994), American WNBA player
- Tiffany Monique (born 1977), American singer, songwriter, and background vocalist
- Tiffany Montague, UK-born American former Google employee
- Tiffany Montgomery (born 1982), birth name of Ryan Starr, American singer and actress
- Tiffany Moore (1976–1988), American 12-year-old girl who was murdered in 1988
- Tiffany Moss (born 1983), American convicted of murdering Emani Moss
- Tiffany Mulheron (born 1984), Scottish former actress
- Tiffany Mynx, American pornographic actress and film director
- Tiffany P. Cunningham (born 1976), American circuit judge
- Tiffany Page (born 1986), English singer-songwriter
- Tiffany Pham (born 1986), American entrepreneur, TV- and film personality, author, and artist
- Tiffany Pisani (born 1992), British-Maltese beauty pageant titleholder
- Tiffany Pollard (born 1982), American reality television personality
- Tiffany Poon, (born 1996), Classical pianist
- Tiffany Porter (born 1987), British-American track and field athlete
- Tiffany Price, American politician
- Tiffany Red (born 1986), American R&B singer-songwriter
- Tiffany Reisz, American author
- Tiffany Roberts (born 1977), American soccer coach and former player
- Tiffany Roberts-Lovell, American politician
- Tiffany Schmidt, American researcher and chronobiologist
- Tiffany Scott (born 1977), American figure skater
- Tiffany Scott (prisoner) (1990s–2024), Scottish transgender prisoner
- Tiffany Selby, American model
- Tiffany Sessions (born 1968), American woman who has been missing since 1989
- Tiffany Sfikas (born 1977), British-American pair skater
- Tiffany Shaw, Canadian geophysical scientist
- Tiffany Shepis (born 1979), American actress
- Tiffany Shlain (born 1970), American filmmaker, artist, and author
- Tiffany Simelane (1988–2009), Swazi beauty queen
- Tiffany Singh (born 1978), New Zealand artist
- Tiffany Smith, American Miss Alaska USA titleholder in 1991
- Tiffany Snow (born 1981), American field hockey player
- Tiffany Sornpao (born 1998), American-born Thai footballer
- Tiffany Stansbury (born 1983), American WNBA player
- Tiffany Stern (born 1968), British historian, academic, and Shakespeare scholar
- Tiffany Steuber (born 1977), Canadian curler
- Tiffany Stewart (born 1974), American clinical psychologist and professor
- Tiffany Stiegler (born 1984), American figure skater
- Tiffany Stratton (born 1999), ring name of Jessica Woynilko, American professional wrestler, bodybuilder, and gymnast
- Tiffany Strout, American politician
- Tiffany T. Alston (born 1977), American politician
- Tiffany Tang (born 1983), Chinese actress and singer
- Tiffany Taylor (born 1977), American nude model
- Tiffany Thayer (1902–1959), American actor and writer
- Tiffany Thomas Kane (born 2001), Australian retired Paralympic swimmer
- Tiffany Thornton (born 1986), American former actress, radio personality, and singer
- Tiffany Tolnay (born 1987), American former collegiate artistic gymnast
- Tiffany Townsend (born 1989), American track and field sprinter
- Tiffany Travis (born 1978), American retired WNBA player
- Tiffany Trump (born 1993), daughter of Donald Trump and Marla Maples
- Tiffany Tshilumba (born 1996), Luxembourgish sprinter
- Tiffany van Soest (born 1989), American kickboxer
- Tiffany Viagas (born 2002), Gibraltarian footballer
- Tiffany Villarreal, American singer
- Tiffany Vise (born 1986), American figure skater
- Tiffany Vollmer (born 1973), American film producer, make-up artist, and voice actress
- Tiffany Weimer (born 1983), American soccer player
- Tiffany Welford (born 1985), Australian former professional tennis player
- Tiffany Whitton (born 1987), American woman who has been missing since 2013
- Tiffany Williams (born 1983), American hurdler
- Tiffany Williamson, American corporate lawyer
- Tiffany Willoughby-Herard (born 1973), American academic and author
- Tiffany Woosley (born 1973), American former professional basketball player
- Tiffany Young (born 1989) (stage name of Stephanie Hwang), Korean-American singer, a member of Girls' Generation
- Tiffany Yu (born 1988), American entrepreneur and disability rights advocate
- Tiffany Yuen (born 1993), Hong Kong activist and politician
- Tiffany Zahorski (born 1994), English-Russian ice dancer
- Tiffany Zaloudek, American military officer and internet personality
- Tiffany Zulkosky (born 1984), American politician

=== Tiffeny ===
- Tiffeny Milbrett (born 1972), American former professional soccer player

=== Tiffiny ===
- Tiffiny Blacknell (born 1976), American lawyer, community activist, and criminal justice reform advocate
- Tiffiny Hall (born 1984), Australian personal trainer, author, journalist, and television personality
- Tiffiny Mitchell, American politician

=== Fictional characters ===
- Tiffany Aching, from the Discworld series by Terry Pratchett
- Tiffany Blum-Deckler, from the animated sitcom Daria
- Tiffany Butcher (also Dean, Jackson and Butcher), from BBC soap opera EastEnders, played by Maisie Smith
- Tiffany Case, from the James Bond novel and movie Diamonds Are Forever
- Tiffany (comics), from the comic book Spawn
- Tiffany "Pennsatucky" Doggett, from the Netflix series Orange Is the New Black
- Tiffany Donely, from ABC soap opera General Hospital, portrayed by actress Sharon Wyatt
- Tiffany Fox, from Batman
- Tiffany Jerimovich, from The Bear
- Tiffany Lords, from the Rival Schools video game series
- Tiffany Malloy, from the sitcom Unhappily Ever After
- Tiffany McLachlan, from Australian soap opera Neighbours, played by Amber Kilpatrick
- Tiffany Mitchell, from BBC soap opera EastEnders. Another character, Tiffany Dean, was named after her
- Tiffany Pratt, from New Zealand soap opera Shortland Street, portrayed by Alison James
- Tiffany Valentine, one of the antagonists in Bride of Chucky as well as Seed of Chucky
- Tiffany Welles, from Charlie's Angels, portrayed by Shelley Hack
- Tiffany, from the film The Matrix Resurrections

== See also ==
- Tiffany (surname)
- Tiffany Problem
- Tiffanie (given name), an alternate spelling of Tiffany
- Tiphanie
- Tiphaine
- Theophania
- Theophano
