= Wade Township, Illinois =

Wade Township is the name of two townships in the U.S. state of Illinois:

- Wade Township, Clinton County, Illinois
- Wade Township, Jasper County, Illinois

See also

- Wade (disambiguation)
