= Recency illusion =

Mistaken belief that something is of recent origin

The recency illusion is the belief or impression, on the part of someone who has only recently become aware of a long-established phenomenon, that the phenomenon itself must be of recent origin. The term was coined by Arnold Zwicky, a linguist at Stanford University who is primarily interested in examples involving words, meanings, phrases, and grammatical constructions. However, use of the term is not restricted to linguistic phenomena: Zwicky has defined it simply as, "the belief that things you have noticed only recently are in fact recent".

According to Zwicky, the illusion is caused by selective attention.

== Examples ==
The use of they, them, or their to reference a singular antecedent without specific gender, as in "If George or Sally come by, give them the package", is known as the singular they. Although this usage is often cited as a modern invention, it is quite old, (Note: Merriam Webster's Dictionary of English Usage noted, "Although the lack of a common-gender third person pronoun has received much attention in recent years from those concerned with women's issues, the problem, as felt by writers, is much older" (1989, page 901).) and has been in regular use in formal contexts as far back as the 14th century.

Other examples include doable from Middle English, legit from the 1890s, and high in the sense of 'intoxicated' from the 1920s. The use of OMG, an abbreviation for oh my God, was first recorded in 1917 in a letter to Winston Churchill.

The Tiffany problem is the phenomenon that names like Tiffany may appear anachronistic in historical fiction, despite being historically attested, due to their modern usage.

== See also ==
- Frequency illusion
