= Tiphaine (given name) =

Tiphaine is a Francophone given name. Notable people with the name include:

- Tiphaine Raguenel (born 1335), Breton noblewoman and astrologer
- Tiphaine Duquesne (born 1996), field hockey player from Belgium
- Tiphaine Samoyault (born 1968), French university lecturer, literary critic, and novelist

== See also ==
- Tiphaine (surname)
- Tiffany (disambiguation)
- Typhaine case, a 2009 infanticide in France
