= Breakfast (disambiguation) =

Breakfast is the first meal of the day.

Breakfast may also refer to:

== Arts, entertainment, and media ==
- The Breakfast (Le Petit Déjeuner), a 1915 painting by Juan Gris

=== Broadcasting ===
- Breakfast, the early-morning daypart period on a radio or television station when most listeners or viewers will be eating breakfast, e.g.:
  - Breakfast (Australian TV program), a 2012 Australian TV program on Network Ten
  - Breakfast (New Zealand TV program), a New Zealand TV program on TV One
    - Saturday Breakfast, a 2011–2012 Saturday edition of the daily New Zealand program
  - Breakfast (Philippine TV program), a 1999–2007 Filipino television program that aired on Studio 23
  - Breakfast, a weekday radio program on BBC Radio 3
  - BBC Breakfast, a British TV program simulcast on BBC One and the BBC News channel
  - Breakfast News, a 1989–2000 British TV program that aired on BBC One
  - Breakfast Time (British TV programme), a 1983–1989 British TV program on BBC One
  - CP24 Breakfast, a Canadian TV program on CP24
  - News Breakfast, or ABC News Breakfast, a 2008 Australian TV program on ABC1 and ABC News 24
  - RN Breakfast, an Australian Broadcasting Corporation radio program
  - The Big Breakfast, a 1992–2002 British TV program on Channel 4
- "Breakfast" (airdate 1987), the first episode of the British TV series ChuckleVision
- "The Breakfast" (King Rollo), a 1980 TV episode

=== Music ===
==== Albums ====
- Breakfast (Chiddy Bang album), or the title song, 2012
- Breakfast, by Mr Floppy, or the title song, 1991

==== Songs ====
- "Breakfast" (Associates song), from Perhaps, 1985
- "Breakfast" (Dove Cameron song), from Alchemical: Volume 1, 2022
- "Breakfast", by Brockhampton from All-American Trash, 2016
- "Breakfast", by Kelis from Food, 2014
- "Breakfast", by Newsboys from Take Me to Your Leader, 1996
- "Breakfast", by Sly Withers from Gardens, 2020
- "Breakfast (Syrup)", by Kreayshawn featuring 2 Chainz, 2012

== See also ==
- Break fast, the meal eaten after Jewish fast days such as Yom Kippur and Tisha B'Av
- Breakfast at Tiffany's (disambiguation)
- Wedding breakfast, a British term for the meal and reception following a marriage service
- Breakfast Princess, a character who first appeared in the episode "Hitman" of the animated series Adventure Time
