= Arnold Zwicky =

American linguist (born 1940)

- Born: September 6, 1940 (age 86); Allentown, Pennsylvania
- Education: Princeton University, MIT
- Spouse: Ann Daingerfield Zwicky
- Scientific career
- Fields: Linguistics
- Workplaces: Stanford University, Ohio State University
- Thesis: Topics in Sanskrit Phonology (1965)
- Doctoral advisor: Morris Halle
- Website: https://web.stanford.edu/~zwicky/

Arnold Melchior Zwicky (born September 6, 1940) is an American linguist, adjunct professor at Stanford University, and distinguished university professor emeritus of linguistics at the Ohio State University. The Linguistic Society of America's Arnold Zwicky Award, given for the first time in 2021, is intended to recognize the contributions of LGBTQ+ scholars in linguistics; Zwicky was the first LGBTQ+ president of the LSA.

== Early life and education ==
Zwicky was born on September 6, 1940, in Allentown, Pennsylvania. He received a Bachelor of Arts in mathematics at Princeton University (1962). He was a student of Morris Halle at the Massachusetts Institute of Technology (MIT) and received a Doctor of Philosophy in Linguistics in 1965.

== Career ==
Zwicky has made notable contributions to fields of phonology (half rhymes), morphology (realizational morphology, rules of referral), syntax (clitics, construction grammar), interfaces (the Principle of Phonology-Free Syntax), sociolinguistics and American dialectology.

He coined the term "recency illusion", the belief that a word, meaning, grammatical construction or phrase is of recent origin when it is in fact of long-established usage. For example, the figurative use of the intensifier "literally" is often perceived to have recent origin, but in fact it dates back several centuries. The phenomenon is thought to be caused by selective attention.

At the Linguistic Society of America's 1999 Summer Institute (held at UIUC) he was the Edward Sapir professor, the most prestigious chair of this organization, of which he is a past president.

He is one of the editors of Handbook of Morphology, among other published works. He is also well known as a frequent contributor to the linguistics blog Language Log, as well as his own personal blog that largely focuses on linguistics issues.

Zwicky was elected as a member of the American Academy of Arts and Sciences in 1992. He is a former board member of the National Organization of Gay and Lesbian Scientists and Technical Professionals, who chose him as 2008 GLBT Scientist of the Year.

== Selected publications ==
As sole author/editor

- — (1971). "In a Manner of Speaking". Linguistic Inquiry. 2 (2): 223–233.
- — (1972). "Note on a Phonological Hierarchy in English". In Stockwell, Robert S.; Macaulay, Ronald K. S. (eds.). Linguistic change and generative theory. pp. 275–301.
- — (1974). "Hey, whatsyourname". Chicago Linguistic Society. 10.
- — (1977). "On Clitics". Indiana University Linguistics Club.
- — (1985). "Clitics and Particles". Language. 61 (2): 283–305. doi:10.2307/414146. hdl:1811/81344. JSTOR 414146.
- — (1985). "Heads". Journal of Linguistics. 21 (1): 1–29. doi:10.1017/S0022226700010008. S2CID 250438550.
- — (1985). "How to describe inflection". Annual Meeting of the Berkeley Linguistics Society. 11: 372–386.
- — (1987). "Suppressing the Zs". Journal of Linguistics. 23 (1): 133–148. doi:10.1017/S0022226700011063. S2CID 144660720.

As co-author/co-editor

- —; Geis, Michael L. (1971). "On Invited Inferences". Linguistic Inquiry. 2 (4): 561–566.
- —; Halpern, Aaron L., eds. (1996). Approaching Second: Second Position Clitics and Related Phenomena. Stanford, CA: CSLI Publications.
- —; Pullum, Geoffrey K. (1983). "Cliticization vs. Inflection: English n't". Language. 59 (3): 502–513. doi:10.2307/413900. JSTOR 413900.
- —; Pullum, Geoffrey K. (1986). "Phonological resolution of syntactic feature conflict". Language: 751–773.
- —; Pullum, Geoffrey K. (1987). "Plain morphology and expressive morphology". Annual Meeting of the Berkeley Linguistics Society. 13: 330–340. doi:10.3765/bls.v13i0.1817.
- —; Pullum, Geoffrey K. (1988). "The syntax-phonology interface". In Newmeyer, Frederick J. (ed.). Linguistics: The Cambridge Survey. Vol. 1. pp. 255–280.
- —; Sadock, Jerrold M. (1975). "Ambiguity tests and how to fail them". Syntax and Semantics. 4: 1–36.
- —; Sadock, Jerrold M. (1985). "Speech Act Distinctions in Syntax". Language Typology and Syntactic Description. 1: 155–196.
- —; Spencer, Andrew, eds. (2001). The Handbook of Morphology. Hoboken, NJ: Wiley.

== See also ==
- LGBT people in science
