= Wayde =

Wayde may refer to:

- Wayde Bowles (1944–2020), wrestler
- Wayde Butler (born 1969), American football player
- Wayde Compton (born 1972), writer
- Wayde Mills (born 1987), footballer
- Wayde Preston (1929–1992), actor
- Wayde Skipper (born 1983), footballer
- Wayde van Niekerk (born 1992), track and field athlete
- Wayde Watson, Bahamian politician

== See also ==
- Wade (disambiguation)
