= Tiphaine (surname) =

Tiphaine is a Francophone surname. Notable people with the name include:

- Bernard Tiphaine (1938–2021), French actor

== See also ==
- Tiphaine (given name)
- Tiffany (disambiguation)
- Typhaine case, a 2009 infanticide in France
