= Tiffany =

Tiffany may refer to:

== People ==
- Tiffany (given name), list of people with this name
- Tiffany (surname), list of people with this surname
- Tiffany (American wrestler) (born 1985), better known by her birth name Taryn Terrell
- Tiffany (Mexican wrestler) (born 1973), Mexican professional wrestler
- Tiffany Darwish, (born 1971), known mononymously as Tiffany, American singer, songwriter and actress
- Tiffany Young, (born 1989), known mononymously as Tiffany, American singer, member of Girls' Generation

== Businesses ==
- Tiffany & Co., a jewelry and specialty retailer founded by Charles Lewis Tiffany
  - Tiffany Blue, the colloquial name for the light medium robin egg blue color associated with Tiffany & Co.
  - Tiffany jewelry, a style of jewelry created by Louis Comfort Tiffany at Tiffany & Co.
  - Tiffany setting, a prong setting for diamonds
- Louis Comfort Tiffany or Tiffany Studios, or Tiffany Glass and Decorating Company
  - Tiffany glass
  - Tiffany lamp
- Tiffany Pictures, a movie studio
- Tiffany (automobile), an electric car manufactured 1913–1914

== Places ==
=== United States ===
- Tiffany, Colorado, an unincorporated community
- Tiffany, Wisconsin, a town
- Tiffany, Rock County, Wisconsin, an unincorporated community

== Animals ==
- Tiffany or Tiffanie, a breed of domestic cat also known as the Asian Semi-longhair
- Chantilly-Tiffany, a breed of domestic cat also known as the Foreign Longhair

== Entertainment ==
- Tiffany (Child's Play), a murderous doll in the Child's Play series of horror films
- Tiffany (album), by Tiffany Darwish, 1987
- Tiffany (Image Comics), a fictional character in Todd McFarlane's Spawn comic book series
- Tiffany Club, a defunct jazz club in Los Angeles

== Military awards ==
- Tiffany Cross Medal of Honor, World War I era US Navy and US Marine Corps Medal of Honor

== Other uses ==
- Tiffany (silk), a light, thin, and transparent silk material, similar to a gauze
- List of storms named Tiffany, three tropical cyclones in the Australian region of the Southern Hemisphere
- Tiffany Problem, a problem in historical fiction

== See also ==
- Breakfast at Tiffany's (disambiguation)
