= Waid =

Waid or WAID may refer to:

- D. Everett Waid (1864–1939), American architect
- Mark Waid (born 1962), American comic book writer
- Waid Academy, a public secondary school in Anstruther, Fife, Scotland
  - Waid Academy FPRFC, a rugby union club based at the school
- Waid Vanderpoel (1922–2003), American financier
- WAID, a radio station in Clarksdale, Mississippi, United States

== See also ==
- Wade (disambiguation)
