= Wade =

Wade, WADE, or Wades may refer to:

== Places in the United States ==
- Wade, Maine, a town
- Wade, Mississippi, a census-designated place
- Wade, North Carolina, a town
- Wade, Ohio, an unincorporated community
- Wade Township, Clinton County, Illinois
- Wade Township, Jasper County, Illinois
- Wade County, Choctaw Nation, a former political subdivision
- Wades Branch, a river in Tennessee

== People, fictional characters and mythological creatures ==
- Wade (given name), a list of people and fictional characters
- Wade (surname), including a list of people and fictional characters
- Wade (folklore), a being from Germanic mythology and folklore

== Other uses ==
- Wade (film), a 2020 Indian animated short film
- World Alliance for Decentralized Energy (WADE)
- Wade Ceramics, manufacturers of porcelain and earthenware; known for making "Whimsies"
- WADE (AM), a radio station in Wadesboro, North Carolina, United States
- Wade–Giles, a method of Romanisation of Chinese, sometimes abbreviated as Wade
- Wade Stadium, a baseball field in Duluth, Minnesota, United States
- Wade Trophy, for the best woman basketball player in National Collegiate Athletic Association Division I
- The Wades, a British band

== See also ==
- Roe v. Wade, a landmark 1973 United States Supreme Court decision on the issue of abortion
- Waad (disambiguation), another form of the name
