= Theophania =

Theophania (Greek for "Manifestation of God" or "Epiphany") may refer to:

- Theophania (Eusebius) ("On Divine Manifestation"), a c. AD 324 Greek theological work by Eusebius
- Theophanu or Theophania (960-991), Byzantine princess and Empress of the Holy Roman Empire
- Theophano Martinakia (died 893), first wife of Leo VI the Wise
- Feofaniya or Theophania, a park near Kyiv, Ukraine

== See also ==
- Theophany, the appearance or manifestation of a deity to mortals
- Epiphany (holiday), a holiday celebrating the theophany of Jesus Christ
- Tiffany (given name), English for Theophania
- Theophanes (disambiguation) or Feofan, a related masculine given name
- Theophano (disambiguation), another form of the given name
