= Frequency bias =

Frequency bias may refer to:

- Frequency illusion, a cognitive bias.
- Frequency bias (electrical grid), a coefficient in the area control error calculation.
- Islanding detection method in an electrical grid.
