= Cianci =

Cianci is an Italian surname. Notable people with the surname include:

- Buddy Cianci (1941–2016), American politician, attorney, and political commentator
- Cláudia Cianci (born 1996), Portuguese tennis player
- Hugo Cianci (born 1989), French footballer
- Pietro Cianci (born 1996), Italian football striker
- Tiffany Cianci (born 1981), American influencer
- Christian Cianci (born 1989), American author
