= Morphome (linguistics) =

Morphological function in linguistics

A morphome is a function in linguistics which is purely morphological or has an irreducibly morphological component. The term is particularly used by Martin Maiden following Mark Aronoff's identification of morphomic functions and the morphomic level—a level of linguistic structure intermediate between and independent of phonology and syntax. In distinguishing this additional level, Aronoff makes the empirical claim that all mappings from the morphosyntactic level to the level of phonological realisation pass through the intermediate morphomic level.

== Typology of morphomic patterns ==
Functions defined at the morphomic level are of many qualitatively different types.

One example is the different ways the perfect participle can be realised in English––sometimes, this form is created through suffixation, as in bitten and packed, sometimes through a process of ablaut, as in sung, and sometimes through a combination of these, such as broken, which uses ablaut as well as the suffix -n.

Another is the division of lexemes into distinct inflectional classes. Inflectional classes present distinct morphological forms, but these distinctions bear no meaning beyond signalling inflectional patterns; they are internal to morphology, and thus morphomic. Martin Maiden's theory of morphomes has been mostly developed with regard to the Romance languages, where he identified many examples of morphomic stem distributions.

A different typology of morphomic patterns has been put forth by Erich Round. He distinguishes rhizomorphomes, which are a property of roots (corresponding to the traditional notion of inflectional class), metamorphomes, which are a property of paradigms, a set of cells which behave in a particular way (corresponding to the morphome in Maiden's terms, such as patterns of stem distribution), and meromorphomes, which are a property of exponents, and have only been identified for now in Kayardild and related languages.
