= Theofanis =

Theofanis (Greek: Θεοφάνης), often shortened to Fanis (Greek: Φάνης) is a masculine given name of Greek origin that may refer to:

- Fanis Christodoulou (born 1965), Greek basketball player
- Theofanis Gekas (born 1980), Greek footballer
- Fanis Katergiannakis, Born (1974), Greek football goalkeeper
- Fanis Koumpouras (born 1983), Greek basketball player
- Theofanis Michaelas (born 1991), Cypriot middle-distance runner
- Fanis Mouratidis, Greek actor
- Theofanis Tombras (1932–1996), Greek army officer and communications public servant
- Fanis Toutziaris (born 1963), Greek footballer
- Theofanis Tzandaris (born 1993), Greek footballer
- Fanis Katsanevakis (born 1972), Greek travel businessman

== See also ==
- Theophanes (disambiguation), historical variant of this name
- Clifford Fanis, (born 1979), former West Indian cricketer
- Éric Fanis (born 1971), Saint Lucian footballer
