= Frequency illusion =

Kind of cognitive bias

The frequency illusion, also known as the Baader–Meinhof phenomenon, is a cognitive bias in which a person notices a specific concept, word, or product more frequently after recently becoming aware of it.

The name "Baader–Meinhof phenomenon" was coined in 1994 by Terry Mullen in a letter to the St. Paul Pioneer Press. The letter describes how, after mentioning the name of the German militant group Baader–Meinhof once, he kept noticing it. This led to other readers sharing their own experiences of the phenomenon, leading it to gain recognition. It was not until 2005, when Stanford linguistics professor Arnold Zwicky wrote about this effect on his blog, that the name "frequency illusion" was coined.

The occurrence of this phenomenon has increased in frequency among the general public, mainly because of the large increase in algorithmic curation across the internet.

== Causes ==
Several possible causes behind frequency illusion have been put forth. However, the consensus seems to be that the main processes behind this illusion are other cognitive biases and attention-related effects that interact with frequency illusion. Zwicky considered this illusion a result of two psychological processes: selective attention and confirmation bias.

=== Selective attention ===
The main cause behind frequency illusion, and other related illusions and biases, seems to be selective attention. Selective attention refers to the process of selecting and focusing on selective objects while ignoring distractions. This means that people have the unconscious cognitive ability to filter for what they are focusing on.

Selective attention is always at play whenever frequency illusion occurs. Since selective attention directs focus to the information they are searching for, their experience of frequency illusion will also focus on the same stimuli. The process of frequency illusion is inseparable from selective attention, due to the cause-and-effect relationship between the two, so the "frequent" object, phrase, or idea has to be selective.

This means that a particularly triggering or emotive stimulus could catch someone's attention, possibly more than a mundane task they are preoccupied with.

=== Confirmation bias ===
Confirmation bias is a cognitive bias that always interacts with frequency illusion. This bias refers to the tendency of seeking evidence that confirms one's beliefs or hypotheses, while sometimes overlooking evidence to the contrary. Confirmation bias takes effect in the later stages of selective attention, when the individual has already started noticing the specific stimulus. By focusing on this specific stimulus, the individual notices it more, therefore confirming their suspicions of it occurring more frequently, even though in reality the frequency has not changed. In essence, confirmation bias occurs when the individual affected by frequency illusion starts looking for reassurance of this increased frequency, believing their theories to be confirmed as they focus only on the supporting evidence.

=== Recency illusion ===
Recency illusion is another selective attention effect that tends to accompany frequency illusion. This illusion occurs when an individual notices something recently, leading them to be convinced that it originated recently as well. This phenomenon amplifies frequency illusion since it leads the person to become more aware of recent stimuli and increases the chances of them focusing on it in the near future. Similar to frequency illusion, recency illusion is also a result of selective attention, and can be overcome by fact-checking.

=== Split-category effect ===
More relevant to frequency estimations but still a possible cause of the frequency illusion, the split-category effect is the phenomenon in which, when events are split into smaller subcategories, this can increase the predicted frequency of occurrence. An example of this is asking a person to predict the number of dogs in a country or asking them to estimate the number of Beagles, Labradors, Poodles, and French Bulldogs. Based on this effect, the sum of the latter would be larger than the former. The split-category effect could be causing frequency illusion in people – after subcategorizing an object, phrase, or idea, they might be likelier to notice these subcategories, leading them to believe the main category's frequency of occurrence has increased.

== Theoretical explanations ==
=== Cognitive information processing ===
The concept of cognitive information processing, including phenomena such as frequency illusion, suggests that regressive frequency judgements arise from discrepancies in cognitive processing. This occurs when stimulus information is not accurately processed or becomes obscured by errors or inconsistencies, leading to reduced variability in how individuals perceive the frequencies of events compared to what is actually observed. Similar to participants in a conditioning experiment learning reinforcement patterns of certain stimuli, individuals become attentive to differences from an equal distribution in frequency. With time, this inefficient learning can distort frequency perception, causing overestimation of less common events and resulting in a flattening of subjective frequency distributions.

Numerous studies have documented the phenomenon of frequency illusion. In a study by Begg et al, two experiments were carried out. The first aimed to investigate how repeating words in different contexts affects frequency estimates, while the second assessed the perceived frequency of different item types that were presented differently at the start. Results showed that frequency estimates are influenced by contexts, especially if they are semantically related, with contextual variety strongly correlating with frequency estimation. The second experiment found that certain factors, like emotions or vivid qualities of items, can lead individuals to overestimate the perception of frequency of occurrences. This research provides empirical evidence for the frequency illusion phenomenon while emphasizing the role of contextual factors and emotional salience in shaping frequency perceptions.

=== Information-loss account ===
According to the information-loss account, frequency illusions arise due to unsystematic error in processing skewed distributions. This means that people may mistakenly believe that certain events or phenomena happen more often than they actually do because of inaccuracies or biases in how they process information. Specifically, this can lead to a regression effect in accuracy of frequency estimates. This regression effect is more pronounced for smaller sample sizes, resulting in less reliable or accurate estimates of minority statistics and less common occurrences.

== Challenges in decision making ==
=== Mongoose Phenomenon ===
Potential misutilization of frequency illusions in problem-solving or diagnosis contexts has been noted by researchers. This cognitive bias can lead individuals to discount rarer causes or events, attributing their perception solely to increased awareness. However, the "Mongoose Phenomenon" challenges conventional views on frequency illusions in decision-making. Instead, it suggests that overlooked events may not be as uncommon as perceived. This highlights the limitations of relying solely on increased awareness to explain perceived frequency.

Moreover, comparisons to Occam's razor versus Hickam's dictum in medicine underscore the need for caution when applying frequency illusions. This encourages a more nuanced and critical approach to decision-making processes to prevent potential harm or oversight that may arise from relying on oversimplified interpretations of frequency illusions.

=== Natural frequency hypothesis ===
The natural frequency hypothesis posits that humans are evolutionarily adapted to process information in terms of frequencies rather than single-event probabilities. Proponents argue that this preference for frequency formats stems from evolutionary principles as our ancestors relied on specific event memories to make judgements under uncertainty, as they couldn't inherently observe the probability of individual events. This perspective proposes that human cognition has evolved to analyze counts of specific events, making individuals prone to the frequency illusion and leading them to perceive increased occurrences of recently encountered events. Presenting information in natural frequency formats may mitigate certain cognitive illusions, including frequency illusions, by offering a more accurate understanding of event occurrences.

== Real-world examples ==
=== Linguistics ===
Frequency illusion is common in the linguistic field. Zwicky, who coined the term frequency illusion, is a linguist himself. He gave the example of how linguists "working on innovative uses of 'all,' especially the quotative use," believed their friends used the quotative "all" in conversation frequently. However, when the linguists actually transcribed these conversations, the number of times they used the quotative "all" was found to be significantly lower compared to their expectations. This is most relevant when commenting on modern linguistic trends such as young people using specific phrases. When the phrases' actual frequency of use in the past is examined, however, it is revealed that they are much more frequent throughout history than initially predicted.

Frequency illusion has also been commonly observed in prescriptive language publications, suggesting that prescriptive authors heavily rely on frequency statements and their alignment with empirical linguistic data. A study empirically investigating the illusion found that frequency statements commonly used in prescriptive publication actually constitute instances of frequency illusions, as proposed by Zwicky. Comparison of statements to linguistic sources such as dictionaries shows that they often do not match actual language usage patterns. Discrepancy between prescriptive language norms and empirical linguistic data highlights the need for increased awareness and scrutiny of language prescriptions advocated in such publications.

=== Medicine ===
In the field of medicine, frequency illusion could help doctors, radiologists, and medical professionals detect diseases. Rare diseases or conditions can often get overlooked by those in the medical field due to an unfamiliarity with the condition. For instance, during the peak of the COVID-19 pandemic, doctors worldwide would observe discoloration of toes in patients and quickly conclude that it was a sign of COVID-19 due to concurrent timing. This is because the skin is considered to reflect underlying health conditions during this period. However, later research revealed lower incidence among the patients, demonstrating a misinterpretation influenced by frequency illusion.

Medical researchers suggest that based on frequency illusion, medical professionals, especially those in training, could be primed to notice rarer patterns and lesions, which would lead them to detect rare diseases and conditions with higher accuracy. Even in situations where medical professionals are equipped with extensive medical equipments, the ability to recognise a condition lies in their abilities to distinguish the particular medical condition. Therefore, increasing salience of specific rare diseases enables healthcare providers to leverage the frequency illusion, enhancing diagnostic accuracy and patient care.

=== Marketing ===
Frequency illusion is used by the marketing industry to make this cognitive bias work in their favour. Generally, this is achieved by introducing a product through ads and familiarizing consumers with it. As a result of frequency illusion, once consumers notices the product, they start paying more attention to it. Frequently noticing this product on social media, in conversations, and in real life leads them to believe that the product is more popular – or in more frequent use – than it actually is. Either due to a desire to conform or simply to own the product, a consumer eventually makes the purchase. This phenomenon is a marketing trick that increases the likelihood of the consumer buying the product.

=== Economics ===
An experimental setup in the lab, simulating an economy and shopping experience for research participants, reveals a tendency in perception biased towards aggregate inflation rates. This phenomenon is notably influenced by the inflation rates of frequently purchased goods. One example of this is an empirical study which found that Swedish women perceived a higher overall rate of inflation than their male counterparts when food price inflation was higher than general inflation. As women are responsible for the major share of the food purchases within Swedish households, this implies a bias formed from frequent exposure to specific price changes.

Implications of people's tendency to be affected by frequency illusion can greatly influence economic behavior and decision-making which may affect consumption, investment and policy-making decisions.

=== Research methodology ===
Presence of frequency illusions have implications in research, wherein this cognitive bias can lead to erroneous conclusions. Researchers may inadvertently draw conclusions regarding broader trends based on limited local data. This tendency can arise when there are significant gaps in sampling coverage, resulting in inaccurate assessments of changes or trends across a larger area or population.

== See also ==
- 23 enigma
- Availability cascade
- Confirmation bias
- List of cognitive biases
- Recency illusion
- Selective attention
- Synchronicity
