= Ciani Eventuale =

Eventuale
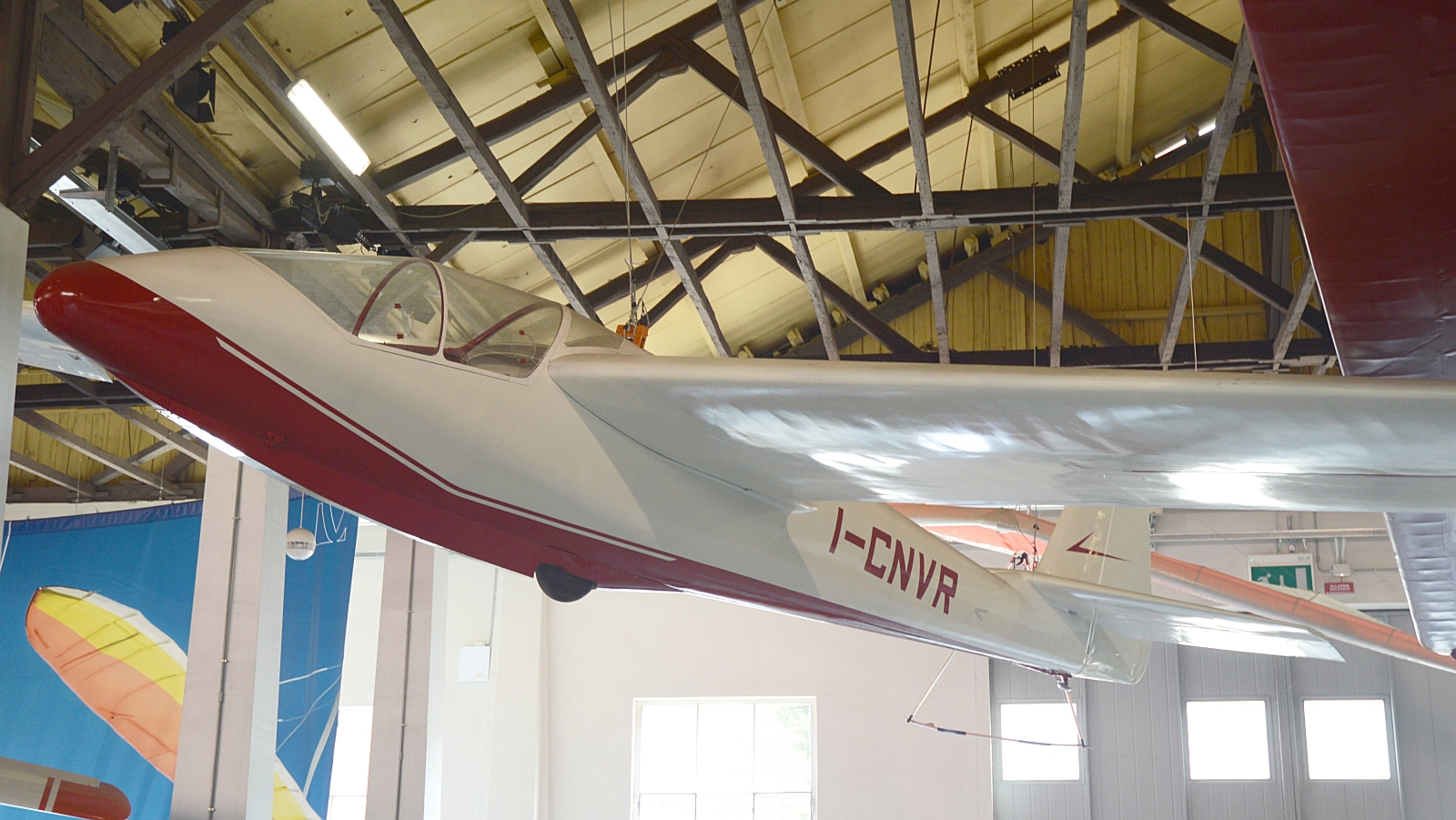

General information
- Type: Two seat high performance glider
- National origin: Italy
- Manufacturer: SSVV (Sezioni Sperimentale di Volo a Vela), Milan
- Designer: Edgardo Ciani
- Number built: 2

History
- First flight: 1962

The Ciani EC 40/62 Eventuale, sometimes known as the SSVV EC 40/62 Eventuale, was an Italian glider. Seating two in tandem, it first flew in 1962 but did not enter production.

== Design and development ==
Ciani designed the Eventuale with the intention of combining the cross country speed of his Urendo with the low speed thermal climb ability of the CVV-6 Canguro. Like his other designs it was built by Sezioni Sperimentale di Volo a Vela (SSVV) of Milan. It had a wooden, straight tapered, mid-mounted wing built around a single spar and entirely plywood covered. The wing spar had slight forward sweep; the wing leading edge was unswept but there was marked forward sweep on the trailing edge. By moving the centre of gravity forward the forward sweep enabled both pilots to sit ahead of the wing, allowing them better visibility. Parallel ruler configuration airbrakes were fitted just aft of the spar at about mid-span.

The oval section fuselage was also wooden, with four longerons and twenty-one formers covered by thick poplar strips, tapering toward the tail. The empennage was straight tapered with fin and tailplane ply covered; the latter could be easily folded up alongside the fin for transport. The elevators were fabric covered, the port side fitted with a trim tab; there was gap between the elevators to allow movement of the rudder, which extended to the keel. The tandem seats were enclosed by a two-piece canopy with the rear position raised by 300 mm (1 ft) to allow its occupant to see forwards to the one instrument panel. The Eventuale landed on a fixed monowheel undercarriage assisted by a rubber sprung forward skid and small tail skid.

== Operational history ==
After the first flight in 1962, one more example of the Eventuale was built, one of which was being restored for static display at the Volandia Museum in Varese in 2010.

== Specifications ==
Data from Italian Vintage Sailplanes

General characteristics

- Crew: 2
- Length: 7.78 m (25 ft 6 in)
- Wingspan: 17.70 m (58 ft 1 in)
- Wing area: 21.30 m^{2} (229.3 sq ft)
- Aspect ratio: 14.80
- Empty weight: 315 kg (694 lb)
- Gross weight: 530 kg (1,168 lb)

Performance

- Maximum glide ratio: best, estimated 30:1
- Wing loading: 25 kg/m^{2} (5.1 lb/sq ft)
