= Morphology (linguistics) =

Study of words and their formation

In linguistics, morphology is the study of how words are formed, and how they relate to one another within a language. Most approaches to morphology investigate the structure of words in terms of morphemes, which are the smallest units in a language with some independent meaning or grammatical function. Morphemes include roots that can exist as words by themselves, but also categories such as affixes that can only appear as part of a larger word. For example, in English the root catch and the suffix ‑ing are both morphemes; catch may appear on its own as a word, or it may be combined with ‑ing to form the new word catching. Morphology also analyzes how words behave as parts of speech, and how they may be inflected to express grammatical categories such as number, tense, and aspect. Morphology also concerns productivity, or how speakers create words in specific contexts. These processes evolve over the history of a language.

The basic fields of linguistics broadly focus on language structure at different "scales". Morphology is considered to operate at a larger scale than phonology, which investigates the categories of speech sounds that are distinguished within a spoken language, and thus may constitute the difference between a morpheme and another; and at a smaller scale than syntax, which investigates how words form phrases and sentences. Morphological typology is a distinct field that categorises languages based on the morphological features they exhibit.

== History ==
The history of ancient Indian morphological analysis dates back to the linguist Pāṇini, who formulated the 3,959 rules of Sanskrit morphology in the text Aṣṭādhyāyī by using a constituency grammar. The Greco-Roman grammatical tradition also engaged in morphological analysis. Studies in Arabic morphology, including the Marāḥ Al-Arwāḥ of Aḥmad b. 'Alī Mas'ūd, date back to at least 1200 CE.

The term "morphology" was introduced into linguistics by August Schleicher in 1859. (Note: Für die lere von der wortform wäle ich das wort « morphologie», nach dem vorgange der naturwißenschaften [...] "Für die Lehre von der Wortform wähle ich das Wort "Morphologie", nach dem Vorgange der Naturwissenschaften [...]", "For the science of word-formation, I choose the term 'morphology' [...]))

== Fundamental concepts ==
=== Lexemes and word-forms ===
The term "word" has no well-defined meaning. Instead, two related terms are used in morphology: lexeme and word-form. Generally, a lexeme is a set of inflected word-forms that is often represented with the citation form in small capitals. For instance, the lexeme eat includes the word-forms eat, eats, eaten, and ate. Eat and eats are therefore different word-forms of the same lexeme. In contrast, eat and eater are distinct lexemes, as they represent two different concepts.

==== Prosodic word vs. morphological word ====
There are instances from other languages of the failure of a single phonological word to coincide with a single morphological word form. In Latin, one way to express the concept of 'NOUN-PHRASE_{1} and NOUN-PHRASE_{2}' (as in "apples and oranges") is to suffix '-que' to the second noun phrase: "apples oranges-and". An extreme level of the theoretical quandary posed by some phonological words is provided by the Kwak'wala language. (Note: Formerly known as Kwakiutl, Kwak'wala belongs to the Northern branch of the Wakashan language family. "Kwakiutl" is still used to refer to the tribe itself, along with other terms.) In Kwak'wala, as in a great many other languages, meaning relations between nouns, including possession and "semantic case", are formulated by affixes, instead of by independent "words". The three-word English phrase, "with his club", in which 'with' identifies its dependent noun phrase as an instrument and 'his' denotes a possession relation, would consist of two words or even one word in many languages. Unlike most other languages, Kwak'wala semantic affixes phonologically attach not to the lexeme they pertain to semantically but to the preceding lexeme. Consider the following example (in Kwak'wala, sentences begin with what corresponds to an English verb): (Note: Example taken from Foley (1998) using a modified transcription. This phenomenon of Kwak'wala was reported by Jacobsen as cited in van Valin & LaPolla (1997).)

kwixʔid-i-da bəgwanəma_{i}-χ-a q'asa-s-is_{i} t'alwagwayu
clubbed-PIVOT-DETERMINER man-ACCUSATIVE-DETERMINER otter-INSTRUMENTAL-3SG-POSSESSIVE club
"the man clubbed the otter with his club."

That is, to a speaker of Kwak'wala, the sentence does not contain the "words" 'him-the-otter' or 'with-his-club' Instead, the markers -i-da (PIVOT-'the'), referring to "man", attaches not to the noun bəgwanəma ("man") but to the verb; the markers -χ-a (ACCUSATIVE-'the'), referring to otter, attach to bəgwanəma instead of to q'asa ('otter'), etc. In other words, a speaker of Kwak'wala does not perceive the sentence to consist of these phonological words:

kwixʔid i-da-bəgwanəma χ-a-q'asa s-is_{i}-t'alwagwayu
clubbed PIVOT-the-man_{i} hit-the-otter with-his_{i}-club

A central publication on this topic is the volume edited by Dixon and Aikhenvald (2002), examining the mismatch between prosodic-phonological and grammatical definitions of "word" in various Amazonian, Australian Aboriginal, Caucasian, Eskimo, Indo-European, Native North American, West African, and sign languages. Apparently, a wide variety of languages make use of the hybrid linguistic unit clitic, possessing the grammatical features of independent words but the prosodic-phonological lack of freedom of bound morphemes. The intermediate status of clitics poses a considerable challenge to linguistic theory.

=== Inflection vs. word formation ===
Given the notion of a lexeme, it is possible to distinguish two kinds of morphological rules. Some morphological rules relate to different forms of the same lexeme, but other rules relate to different lexemes. Rules of the first kind are inflectional rules, but those of the second kind are rules of word formation. The generation of the English plural dogs from dog is an inflectional rule, and compound phrases and words like dog catcher or dishwasher are examples of word formation. Informally, word formation rules form "new" words (more accurately, new lexemes), and inflection rules yield variant forms of the "same" word (lexeme).

The distinction between inflection and word formation is not at all clear-cut. There are many examples for which linguists fail to agree whether a given rule is inflection or word formation. The next section will attempt to clarify the distinction.

Word formation includes a process in which one combines two complete words, but inflection allows the combination of a suffix with a verb to change the latter's form to that of the subject of the sentence. For example: in the present indefinite, 'go' is used with subject I/we/you/they and plural nouns, but third-person singular pronouns (he/she/it) and singular nouns cause 'goes' to be used. The '-es' is therefore an inflectional marker that is used to match with its subject. A further difference is that in word formation, the resultant word may differ from its source word's grammatical category, but in the process of inflection, the word never changes its grammatical category.

=== Types of word formation ===
There is a further distinction between two primary kinds of morphological word formation: derivation and compounding. The latter is a process of word formation that involves combining complete word forms into a single compound form. Dog catcher, therefore, is a compound, as both dog and catcher are complete word forms in their own right but are subsequently treated as parts of one form. Derivation involves affixing bound (non-independent) forms to existing lexemes, but the addition of the affix derives a new lexeme. The word independent, for example, is derived from the word dependent by using the prefix in-, and dependent itself is derived from the verb depend. There is also word formation in the processes of clipping in which a portion of a word is removed to create a new one, blending in which two parts of different words are blended into one, acronyms in which each letter of the new word represents a specific word in the representation (NATO for North Atlantic Treaty Organization), borrowing in which words from one language are taken and used in another, and coinage in which a new word is created to represent a new object or concept.

=== Paradigms and morphosyntax ===
A linguistic paradigm is the complete set of related word forms associated with a given lexeme. The familiar examples of paradigms are the conjugations of verbs and the declensions of nouns. Also, the word forms of a lexeme can be organized into tables by classifying them according to shared inflectional categories such as tense, aspect, mood, number, gender or case. For example, the personal pronouns in English can be organized into tables by using the categories of person (first, second, third); number (singular vs. plural); gender (masculine, feminine, neuter); and case (nominative, oblique, genitive).

The inflectional categories used to group word forms into paradigms cannot be chosen arbitrarily but must be categories that are relevant to stating the syntactic rules of the language. Person and number are categories that can be used to define paradigms in English because the language has grammatical agreement rules, which require the verb in a sentence to appear in an inflectional form that matches the person and number of the subject. Therefore, the syntactic rules of English care about the difference between dog and dogs because the choice between both forms determines the form of the verb that is used. However, no syntactic rule shows the difference between dog and dog catcher, or dependent and independent. The first two are nouns, and the other two are adjectives.

An important difference between inflection and word formation is that inflected word forms of lexemes are organized into paradigms that are defined by the requirements of syntactic rules, and there are no corresponding syntactic rules for word formation.

The relationship between syntax and morphology, as well as how they interact, is called "morphosyntax"; the term is also used to underline the fact that syntax and morphology are interrelated. The study of morphosyntax concerns itself with inflection and paradigms, and some approaches to morphosyntax exclude from its domain the phenomena of word formation, compounding, and derivation. Within morphosyntax fall the study of agreement and government.

=== Allomorphy ===
Above, morphological rules are described as analogies between word forms: dog is to dogs as cat is to cats and dish is to dishes. In this case, the analogy applies both to the form of the words and to their meaning. In each pair, the first word means "one of X", and the second "two or more of X", and the difference is always the plural form -s (or -es) affixed to the second word, which signals the key distinction between singular and plural entities.

One of the largest sources of complexity in morphology is that the one-to-one correspondence between meaning and form scarcely applies to every case in the language. In English, there are word form pairs like ox/oxen, goose/geese, and sheep/sheep whose difference between the singular and the plural is signaled in a way that departs from the regular pattern or is not signaled at all. Even cases regarded as regular, such as -s, are not so simple; the -s in dogs is not pronounced the same way as the -s in cats, and in plurals such as dishes, a vowel is added before the -s. Those cases, in which the same distinction is effected by alternative forms of a "word", constitute allomorphy.

Phonological rules constrain the sounds that can appear next to each other in a language, and morphological rules, when applied blindly, would often violate phonological rules by resulting in sound sequences that are prohibited in the language in question. For example, to form the plural of dish by simply appending an -s to the end of the word would result in the form *[dɪʃs], which is not permitted by the phonotactics of English. To "rescue" the word, a vowel sound is inserted between the root and the plural marker, and [dɪʃɪz] results. Similar rules apply to the pronunciation of the -s in dogs and cats: it depends on the quality (voiced vs. unvoiced) of the final preceding phoneme.

=== Lexical morphology ===
Lexical morphology is the branch of morphology that deals with the lexicon that, morphologically conceived, is the collection of lexemes in a language. As such, it concerns itself primarily with word formation: derivation and compounding.

== Models ==
There are three principal approaches to morphology and each tries to capture the distinctions above in different ways:

- Morpheme-based morphology, which makes use of an item-and-arrangement approach.
- Lexeme-based morphology, which normally makes use of an item-and-process approach.
- Word-based morphology, which normally makes use of a word-and-paradigm approach.

While the associations indicated between the concepts in each item in that list are very strong, they are not absolute.

=== Morpheme-based morphology ===
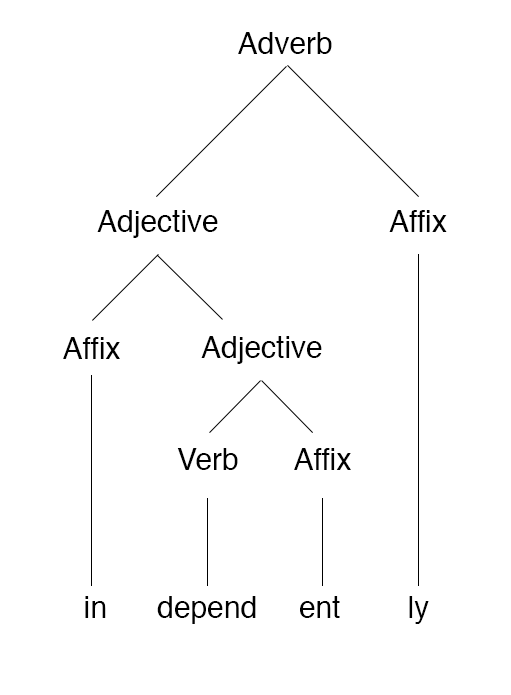
Morpheme-based morphology tree of the word "independently"

In morpheme-based morphology, word forms are analyzed as arrangements of morphemes. A morpheme is defined as the minimal meaningful unit of a language. In a word such as independently, the morphemes are said to be in-, depend, -ent, and -ly; depend is the (free) root and the other morphemes are, in this case, derivational affixes. (Note: The existence of words like appendix and pending in English does not mean that the English word depend is analyzed into a derivational prefix de- and a root pend. While all those were indeed once related to each other by morphological rules, that was only the case in Latin, not in English. English borrowed such words from French and Latin but not the morphological rules that allowed Latin speakers to combine de- and the verb pendere 'to hang' into the derivative dependere.) In words such as dogs, dog is the root and the -s is an inflectional morpheme. In its simplest and most naïve form, this way of analyzing word forms, called "item-and-arrangement", treats words as if they were made of morphemes put after each other ("concatenated") like beads on a string. More recent and sophisticated approaches, such as distributed morphology, seek to maintain the idea of the morpheme while accommodating non-concatenated, analogical, and other processes that have proven problematic for item-and-arrangement theories and similar approaches.

Morpheme-based morphology presumes three basic axioms:

- Baudouin's "single morpheme" hypothesis: Roots and affixes have the same status as morphemes.
- Bloomfield's "sign base" morpheme hypothesis: As morphemes, they are dualistic signs, since they have both (phonological) form and meaning.
- Bloomfield's "lexical morpheme" hypothesis: morphemes, affixes and roots alike are stored in the lexicon.

Morpheme-based morphology comes in two flavours, one Bloomfieldian and one Hockettian. For Bloomfield, the morpheme was the minimal form with meaning, but did not have meaning itself. For Hockett, morphemes are "meaning elements", not "form elements". For him, there is a morpheme plural using allomorphs such as -s, -en and -ren. Within much morpheme-based morphological theory, the two views are mixed in unsystematic ways so a writer may refer to "the morpheme plural" and "the morpheme -s" in the same sentence.

=== Lexeme-based morphology ===
Lexeme-based morphology usually takes what is called an item-and-process approach. Instead of analyzing a word form as a set of morphemes arranged in sequence, a word form is said to be the result of applying rules that alter a word-form or stem in order to produce a new one. An inflectional rule takes a stem, changes it as is required by the rule, and outputs a word form; a derivational rule takes a stem, changes it as per its own requirements, and outputs a derived stem; a compounding rule takes word forms, and similarly outputs a compound stem.

=== Word-based morphology ===
Word-based morphology is (usually) a word-and-paradigm approach. The theory takes paradigms as a central notion. Instead of stating rules to combine morphemes into word forms or to generate word forms from stems, word-based morphology states generalizations that hold between the forms of inflectional paradigms. The major point behind this approach is that many such generalizations are hard to state with either of the other approaches. Word-and-paradigm approaches are also well-suited to capturing purely morphological phenomena, such as morphomes. Examples to show the effectiveness of word-based approaches are usually drawn from fusional languages, where a given "piece" of a word, which a morpheme-based theory would call an inflectional morpheme, corresponds to a combination of grammatical categories, for example, "third-person plural". Morpheme-based theories usually have no problems with this situation since one says that a given morpheme has two categories. Item-and-process theories, on the other hand, often break down in cases like these because they all too often assume that there will be two separate rules here, one for third person, and the other for plural, but the distinction between them turns out to be artificial. The approaches treat these as whole words that are related to each other by analogical rules. Words can be categorized based on the pattern they fit into. This applies both to existing words and to new ones. Application of a pattern different from the one that has been used historically can give rise to a new word, such as older replacing elder (where older follows the normal pattern of adjectival comparatives) and cows replacing kine (where cows fits the regular pattern of plural formation).

== Morphological typology ==
In the 19th century, philologists devised a now classic classification of languages according to their morphology. Some languages are isolating, and have little to no morphology; others are agglutinative whose words tend to have many easily separable morphemes (such as Turkic languages); others yet are inflectional or fusional because their inflectional morphemes are "fused" together (like some Indo-European languages such as Pashto and Russian). That leads to one bound morpheme conveying multiple pieces of information. A standard example of an isolating language is Chinese. An agglutinative language is Turkish (and practically all Turkic languages). Latin and Greek are prototypical inflectional or fusional languages.

It is clear that this classification is not at all clear-cut, and many languages (Latin and Greek among them) do not neatly fit any one of these types, and some fit in more than one way. A continuum of complex morphology of language may be adopted.

The three models of morphology stem from attempts to analyze languages that more or less match different categories in this typology. The item-and-arrangement approach fits very naturally with agglutinative languages. The item-and-process and word-and-paradigm approaches usually address fusional languages.

As there is very little fusion involved in word formation, classical typology mostly applies to inflectional morphology. Depending on the preferred way of expressing non-inflectional notions, languages may be classified as synthetic (using word formation) or analytic (using syntactic phrases).

== Examples ==
In Pingelapese, words can take different forms to add to or even change their meaning. Verbal suffixes are morphemes added at the end of a word to change its form. Prefixes are those that are added at the front. For example, the Pingelapese suffix –kin means 'with' or 'at.' It is added at the end of a verb.

ius = to use → ius-kin = to use with
mwahu = to be good → mwahu-kin = to be good at

sa- is an example of a verbal prefix. It is added to the beginning of a word and means 'not.'

pwung = to be correct → sa-pwung = to be incorrect

There are also directional suffixes that when added to the root word give the listener a better idea of where the subject is headed. The verb alu means to walk. A directional suffix can be used to give more detail.

-da = 'up' → aluh-da = to walk up
-di = 'down' → aluh-di = to walk down
-eng = 'away from speaker and listener' → aluh-eng = to walk away

Directional suffixes are not limited to motion verbs. When added to non-motion verbs, their meanings are figurative. The following table gives some examples of directional suffixes and their possible meanings.

Directional suffix	Motion verb	Non-motion verb
-da	up	Onset of a state
-di	down	Action has been completed
-la	away from	Change has caused the start of a new state
-doa	towards	Action continued to a certain point in time
-sang	from	Comparative

== See also ==
- Morphome (linguistics)
- Morphological richness
