= Tiphanie =

Tiphanie and Typhanie is a feminine given name. Notable people with the name include:

- Tiphanie Brooke (born 1981), American artist
- Typhanie Degois (born 1993), French politician
- Tiphanie Yanique (born 1978), Caribbean American writer

== See also ==
- Tiphaine (disambiguation)
