= Tiffanie (given name) =

Tiffanie is a feminine given name. Notable people with the name include:

- Tiffanie Anderson (born 1988), African American singer and dancer
- Tiffanie Barriere, American bartender
- Tiffanie DeBartolo (born 1970), American novelist and filmmaker

== See also ==
- Tiffany (given name)
