= Tiffany problem =

Problem in historical fiction

The Tiffany problem or Tiffany effect refers to the issue where a historical or realistic fact seems anachronistic or unrealistic to modern audiences of historical fiction, despite being accurate. This often occurs with names, terms, or practices that, although historically accurate, feel out of place because of modern associations. The term was coined in 2018 regarding the observation that despite the name Tiffany being commonly associated with the late 20th century, it dates from around 1600.

== Origin of the term ==
English novelist Nicola Cornick first discussed the Tiffany effect in 2018 after learning about the phenomenon and encountering the term. She explained that the name Tiffany derives from Theophania, a name for girls in medieval England and France. The old French form c. 1200 was Tifinie, and the spelling Tiffany first appears in English c. 1600. However, if a historical fiction writer were to name an English character Tiffany in an Early Modern European setting as early as 1600, the audience would likely perceive it as inaccurate, associating the name with contemporary times, or the 1980s in particular, when the name reached peak popularity. Welsh-Canadian novelist Jo Walton is credited with coining the term "Tiffany problem" in 2019 to refer to this phenomenon.

== Names ==
Like the name Tiffany, the following names have been mistakenly thought to be of modern origin but are actually historical:

- Evelyn originated as a unisex name in 17th-century Britain with aristocrat Evelyn Pierrepont and his daughter. It is derived from the feminine Norman French name Aveline, used in the Middle Ages.
- Imogen, popularized by Shakespeare's Cymbeline.
- Nicola, a feminine or masculine name depending on country of origin, was borne by notable figures like the 12th-century heiress Nicola de la Haie.
- Olivia, from the 13th century, and popularized by Shakespeare's Twelfth Night.
- Regan, a unisex name, was first popularized as a girl's name by Shakespeare's King Lear.
- Shane, a 17th-century masculine name derived from the Gaelic Séan, which derived from John after Normans settled in Ireland in the 12th century.
- Tristan, first popularized by 12th-century poetry concerning the folk hero Tristan and later by the 1994 film Legends of the Fall.
- Wade, which is rooted in Old English and was a popular given name in the Middle Ages.

== Terms and practices ==
The first known vending machine, created in the 1st century CE by Hero of Alexandria, dispensed holy water. This invention predates the modern concept of vending machines by nearly 2,000 years, making it seem anachronistic in ancient history. Hero of Alexandria and contemporaries may have considered this device to be a kind of automaton.

European royalty would have worn silk long before sericulture was brought from China in 552 CE, when two monks, charged by Emperor Justinian, successfully smuggled silkworm larvae from China back to Byzantium, which broke the Chinese monopoly on silk outside of Eastern Asia. The Silk Road connected China with Europe as early as the first century BCE, making silk garments and textiles a fixture of the elite for many hundreds of years.

The oldest recognizably modern postal service (using riders and coaches) can be traced back to the first century in Rome (cursus publicus), and these systems existed at least until the 6th century, with some breaks in the 3rd century, continuing in some parts of Europe, on and off, until the 18th century (Kaiserliche Reichspost). The Inca Empire also had an extensive postal system, which was facilitated by more than 24,000 km (15,000 mi) of roads. A system of runners could allegedly deliver messages from one end of the empire to the other in under a week, covering a distance of nearly 3,200 km (2,000 mi).

Due to the recency illusion, slang may be inaccurately perceived to be newer than it is. Examples include doable from Middle English, legit from the 1890s, and high in the sense of 'intoxicated' from the 1920s. The use of OMG for Oh My God, an abbreviation popular in the 21st century, is first recorded in 1917 in a letter to Winston Churchill.

== See also ==
- Historical authenticity
- Suspension of disbelief
- Verisimilitude
