= Theophanes =

Theophanes may refer to:

== Saints ==
- Theodorus and Theophanes (ca. 778-845), called the Grapti, proponents of the veneration of images during the second Iconoclastic controversy
- Theophanes the Confessor Byzantine 8th-9th-century historian
- Theophan the Recluse (1815–1894) Russian saint
- Théophane Vénard (1821-1869) one of the Vietnamese Martyrs

== Others ==
- Theophanes of Mytilene (1st century BC) political figure and historian in Lesbos
- Theophanes of Byzantium (6th century) Byzantine historian
- Theophanes the Branded (also called Theophanes Graptus or Theophanes of Nicea, 775-845), Byzantine monk and hymnographer
- Theophanes Continuatus Latin name applied to a chronicle continuing the history of Theophanes the Confessor
- Theophanes (chamberlain) (fl.c. 920-945) Byzantine official and chief minister of Emperor Romanos Lekapenos
- Theophanes Nonnus (fl.c. 950), Byzantine physician who wrote outline of medicine dedicated to Emperor Constantine VII Porphyrogenitus
- Theophanes Kerameus (1129-1152) bishop of Rossano, in Italy, and a celebrated homiletic writer.
- Theophanes the Greek (ca. 1340-1410) Byzantine icon painter that worked in Russia
- Theophanes the Cretan (active 1527-48) Cretan icon painter
- Theophanes (Kim) (born 1976), Archbishop of the Russian Orthodox diocese of Korea

== See also ==
- Theofanis, modern variant of this name
- Theophano (disambiguation), a female form of the name
- Theophania (disambiguation), a female form of the name
- Theophanes (crater) a crater on the planet Mercury
