= Ciani Uribel =

EC 39/59 Uribel
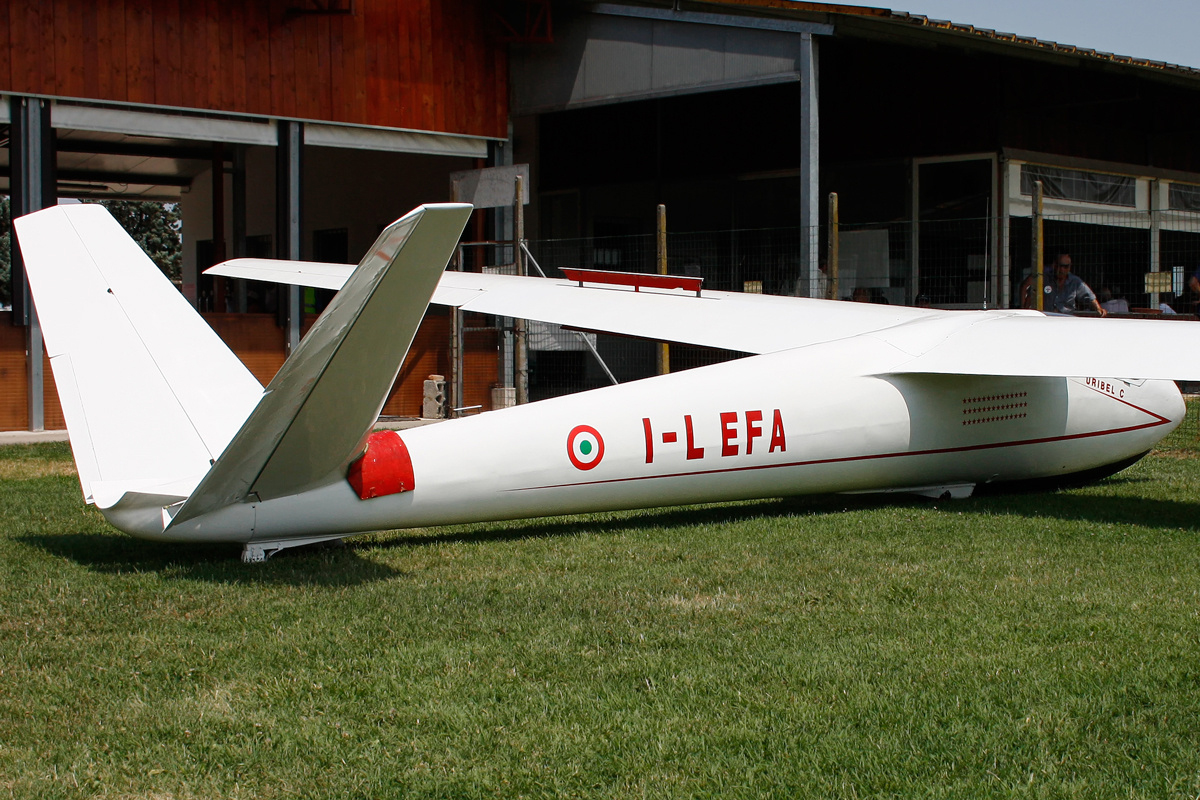
- Ciani EC 39/59 Uribel C on static display at the Historical Aircraft Group FlyParty 2012

General information
- Type: Single seat competition sailplane
- National origin: Italy
- Manufacturer: SSVV (Sezione Sperimentale Volo Vela, an offshoot of the Aeroclub Volovelistico Milanese)
- Designer: Edgardo Ciani
- Number built: c.20

History
- First flight: 1959
- Developed from: Ciani EC 38/56 Urendo

The Ciani EC 59/39 Uribel is a single seat sailplane designed and built in Italy in the late 1950s. It was one of the first to use a new type of laminar flow airfoil, optimised for both high and low speed flight. One example finished fourth in the 1963 World Gliding Championships.

== Design and development ==
The first of the four Uribel variants, the Uribel A, was a single seat version of the earlier EC 38/56 Urendo, mounting its wing at a high position on a new fuselage with a V-tail. The most important development in the series was a change in wing profile from the Uribel A's NACA 6 series to the Eppler 257 of the Uribel B. The Eppler airfoil has low drag in the two speed ranges that sailplanes mostly use: low, when soaring in thermals and high for flight between them. The higher drag region between these speed ranges does not matter, as this speed range is only briefly used. The earlier NACA 6 series provides only a single, wide low drag region. The Uribel B was one of the first sailplanes to use an airfoil with two such "drag buckets".

The Uribel C differs from the B version in having a simpler, straight tapered wing plan, without the forward sweep inherited from the Urendo. The wing is built around a single main spar, with all its surfaces covered in plywood which is generally 1.5 mm (0.059 in) thick except at the roots, where 2.0 mm (0.079 in) ply is used. The plywood skin extends forward almost to the leading edge, where it is bonded to a false spar; the leading edge itself is formed from balsa wood. The wing tips are glass fibre (GRP). Schempp-Hirth type airbrakes are placed aft of the main spar, just inboard of the ailerons. The fixed surfaces of the trapezoidal plan, 100° butterfly tail are also ply covered, as are the trim tabs on the otherwise fabric covered control surfaces.

The fuselage of all the Uribel variants is largely ply covered, elliptical in cross section though becoming slimmer and closer to circular aft. The C version introduced a GRP nose, tail cone and dorsal region behind the cockpit as well as the GRP wing tips. There is a single piece canopy, which smoothly follows the nose line, ahead of the wing. The Uribel lands on a monowheel partly enclosed within a skid.

The final development was the Uribel D, in which a reclined pilot's position allows a reduction in frontal area.

== Operational history ==
The Uribel C competed in two World Gliding Championships. At Junin, Argentina in 1963 L. Brigliadori came 4th in the Standard class. Two years later at RAF South Cerney in the UK he had slipped down the rankings to 16th.

One Uribel C was still active in 2002 and two Uribels, variants C and D, remained on the Italian civil aircraft register in 2010.

== Variants ==
Details from Salplanes 1945-1965

Uribel A
Wing as Urendo, with forward sweep and NACA 64_{3}618 root profile, NACA 747A315 toward tip. Five built.
Uribel B
Forward sweep but Eppler 257 profile. About five built.
Uribel C
No forward sweep, Eppler 257 profile. Five built, one with span extended to 18.00 m.
Uribel D
As C but pilot's position altered, allowing a reduction in fuselage width. Five built.

== Specifications (Uribel C) ==
Data from Sailplanes 1945-1965

General characteristics

- Crew: 1
- Length: 6.94 m (22 ft 9 in)
- Wingspan: 15.00 m (49 ft 3 in)
- Wing area: 13.8 m^{2} (149 sq ft)
- Aspect ratio: 16.2
- Airfoil: Eppler 257
- Empty weight: 220 kg (485 lb)
- Gross weight: 330 kg (728 lb)

Performance

- Lift-to-drag: 30
