= Tiffany Schmidt =

American researcher and chronobiologist

Tiffany M. Schmidt
- Education: Luther College, University of Minnesota
- Awards: Karl Kirchgessner Foundation Vision Research Grant Sloan Research Fellowship Award in Neuroscience Pisart Award for Outstanding Achievements in Vision Science
- Scientific career
- Fields: Chronobiology, Ophthalmology, Neurobiology, Neurocircuitry
- Workplaces: Johns Hopkins University Northwestern University
- Thesis: Intrinsically photosensitive retinal ganglion cells: diversity of form and function (2010)
- Doctoral advisor: Paulo Kofuji
- Website: http://www.schmidtlab-northwestern.com/

Tiffany M. Schmidt is an American researcher and chronobiologist, currently working as an associate professor of Neurobiology at Northwestern University. Schmidt, who works in Evanston, Illinois, studies the role of retinal ganglion cells (RGC) to determine how light can affect behavior, hormonal changes, vision, sleep, and circadian entrainment.

== Education and career ==
Schmidt completed her undergraduate studies at Luther College in Decorah, Iowa in 2006, receiving a Bachelor of Arts in Biology and Honors Psychology. Schmidt then pursued her PhD at the University of Minnesota from 2006 until 2010. She studied under Paulo Kofuji, researching a subset of retinal ganglion cells that are intrinsically photosensitive. Schmidt then performed postdoctoral research at Johns Hopkins University from 2011 until 2014. Schmidt worked in the Hattar Lab under Samer Hattar, continuing to study intrinsically photosensitive retinal ganglion cells (ipRGC).

Schmidt then began as an assistant professor at Northwestern University in the Department of Neurobiology in 2014. Schmidt continued in this role until 2020, when she was appointed as an associate professor in the Department of Neurobiology, with a secondary appointment in the Department of Ophthalmology. Schmidt has served as both the Director of the Undergraduate Neuroscience Program and Director of the Neurobiology MS Program at Northwestern University. Here, she works as the Principal Investigator (PI) in the Schmidt Lab.

Schmidt continues to be an associate professor at Northwestern, and often publishes work and speaks at universities or conferences to present her research. A few of Schmidt's presentations at conferences and universities have been recorded and are available for members of the public to view. In 2019, as part of the #Womeninscience campaign presented by Scientifica, she gave an interview discussing her path to becoming a PI, as well as how she balances her family life and career demands.

== Research contributions ==
=== Changes in ipRGC light responses during development ===
As a graduate student in the laboratory of Paulo Kofuji at the University of Minnesota, Schmidt's research focused on analyzing intrinsically photosensitive retinal ganglion cells (ipRGCs) at the single-cell level to determine how ipRGCs relay light information to the brain. In early experiments, Schmidt and colleagues created a transgenic mouse line in which the melanopsin promoter drives the expression of enhanced green fluorescent protein (EGFP). This allowed them to label ipRGCs in vivo and study changes in ipRGC light sensitivity and synaptic connectivity over the course of postnatal development. Results from whole-cell recordings of ipRGC membrane voltage in response to white-light stimuli demonstrated that ipRGCs shift from relying solely on intrinsic phototransduction before mice open their eyes to relying on intrinsic and extrinsic phototransduction after eye-opening. The intrinsic phototransduction pathway was mediated by melanopsin, while the extrinsic pathway utilized retinal rod and cone systems. The ability to label ipRGCs with EGFP also allowed Schmidt and her colleagues to specify the morphology and location of three ipRGC subpopulations within the inner plexiform layer of the retina.

=== Functional differences between M1 and M2 ipRGCs ===
In 2009, Schmidt and Kofuji utilized the same transgenic mouse line to label ipRGCs in vivo with EGFP which allowed them to identify functional differences between the M1 and M2 ipRGC subpopulations. The results identified morphological differences in M1 and M2 ipRGCs, including larger dendrites and soma within the M2 subpopulation. M2 ipRGCs also displayed more complex dendritic branching. In addition, using techniques from electrophysiology, such as current-clamp recordings, voltage-clamp recordings, and patch-clamping, this research identified differences in the light responses of M1 and M2 ipRGCs. Results from this study suggested that M1 ipRGCs have higher levels of melanopsin than M2 cells and showed most definitively that M2 cells are intrinsically photosensitive, a finding that had not yet been discovered in prior research. These differences between M1 and M2 ipRGCs suggested the possibility that these subpopulations might signal light information to different areas of the brain.

=== Role of melanopsin and ON alpha RGCs on image-forming vision ===
In 2014, as a postdoctoral fellow in the laboratory of Samer Hattar at Johns Hopkins University, Schmidt and colleagues used immunohistochemistry to identify that a subset of retinal ganglion cells, ON alpha RGCs, express a melanopsin reporter. Whole-cell recordings from ON alpha RGCs showed that these cells are intrinsically photosensitive. Together, these results suggested that the intrinsic photosensitivity of ON alpha RGCs is driven by melanopsin, which was confirmed using melanopsin-deficient (Opn4^{-/-}) mice, as the ON alpha RGCs in these mice were observed to completely lose intrinsic photosensitivity. Furthermore, ON alpha RGCs in diurnal ground squirrels displayed intrinsic photosensitivity which suggested that this may be a feature of ON alpha RGCs across several different species.

This study also identified the role of melanopsin in contrast detection, an important aspect of image-forming vision. Schmidt and Hattar used an optokinetic tracking assay to determine that Opn4^{-/-} mice showed reduced contrast sensitivity. Deficits in contrast sensitivity were significantly worsened in a mouse model in which ON alpha RGCs were ablated. These results demonstrate that melanopsin and ON alpha RGCs play a role in image-forming vision by regulating contrast sensitivity.

== Awards and achievements ==
Over the course of her career, Schmidt has received several awards for her work. As a graduate student at the University of Minnesota, she won the Morris Smithberg Memorial Prize from the Graduate Program in Neuroscience in 2007 which is granted to the best performing student on first-year courses and the final written exam. Additionally, she won the Milne and Brandenburg Research Award in 2010 which is awarded to students for their thesis research in the biomedical sciences. In her thesis, Schmidt studied the properties and morphology of ipRGCs.

Schmidt has been awarded several fellowships, awards, and grants for her research. She won the New Innovator Award from the NIH in January 2016 for her project titled "Genetic Mapping of Visual Circuits." The award is given to new researchers whose projects show potential to have wide-ranging impacts. In 2016, Schmidt won the Karl Kirchgessner Foundation Vision Research Grant which is a foundation that primarily supports disadvantaged individuals but also grants money for new research in vision. In 2016, she won the Klingenstein-Simons Fellowship Award in the Neurosciences for her work in light-driven behavior. Additionally, in 2017 she won the Sloan Research Fellowship Award in Neuroscience which is a two-year $75,000 fellowship granted to young researchers, and in 2019 she was a recipient of the Brain Research Fay/Frank Seed Grant which funds neuroscience research. She received the Pisart Award for Outstanding Achievements in Vision Science in 2019. In 2020, Schmidt won the Junior Faculty Award from the Society for Research on Biological Rhythms for her exceptional work in the chronobiology field.

== Current laboratory research and focuses ==
=== Recent grants and publications ===
Currently, Schmidt is still conducting research in her lab at Northwestern University. In 2020, Schmidt earned tenure and was promoted to associate professor at Northwestern. Also in 2020, the Schmidt Lab received the Chicago Biomedical Research Consortium Catalyst Award which provided funding for further laboratory research in chronobiology.

On September 2, 2022, the Schmidt Lab's R21 research grant application was accepted and funded by the NIH's (National Institute of Health) NEI department (National Eye Institute). This grant specifically funded the production of ipRGC circuit manipulation facilities. Schmidt is the PI on two R01 research grants, as well.

Recent publications from the Schmidt Lab have identified the roles of melanopsin phototransduction pathways in ipRGC subtypes and have further explored the diversity of ipRGC functions.

Other recent research focuses include behavioral sensitivities of ipRGCs to light, functions of M4 and M5 ipRGCs, cellular properties of ipRGCs in postnatal development, and using single-cell RNA sequencing to determine subsets of retinal ganglion cells.

=== Selected recent publications ===
- Laboissonniere, Lauren A.; Sonoda, Takuma; Lee, Seul K; Trimarchi, Jeffrey M.; Schmidt, Tiffany M. Single-cell RNA-Seq of Defined Subsets of Retinal Ganglion Cells. Journal of Visualized Experiments (123): 55229 (2017).
- Rupp, Alan C.; Ren, Michelle; Altimus, Cara M.; Fernandez, Diego C.; Richardson, Melissa; Turek, Fred; Hattar, Samer; Schmidt, Tiffany M. Distinct ipRGC subpopulations mediate light's acute and circadian effect on body temperature and sleep. eLife 8:e44358 (2019).
- Sonodoa, Takuma; Okabe, Yudai; Schmidt, Tiffany M. Overlapping morphological and functional properties between M4 and M5 intrinsically photosensitive retinal ganglion cells. Journal of Comparative Neurology 528 (6): 1028-1040 (2019).
- Lucas, Jasmine A.; Okabe, Yudai; Schmidt, Tiffany M. Cellular properties of intrinsically photosensitive retinal ganglion cells during postnatal development. Neural Development 14 (1): 8 (2019).
- Sonoda, Takuma; Li, Jennifer Y.; Hayes, Nikolas W.; Chan, Jonathan C.; Okabe, Yudai; Belin, Stephane; Nawabi, Homaira; Schmidt, Tiffany M. A noncanonical inhibitory circuit dampens behavioral sensitivity to light. Science 368 (6490): 527-531 (2020).
- Aranda, Marcos L.; Schmidt, Tiffany M. Diversity of intrinsically photosensitive retinal ganglion cells: circuits and functions. Cellular and Molecular Life Sciences 78 (3): 889-907 (2021).
- Contreras, Ely; Sonoda, Takuma; Birnbaumer, Lutz; Schmidt, Tiffany M. Melanopsin activates divergent phototransduction pathways in ipRGC subtypes. bioRxiv (2022).
