= Verisimilitude (fiction) =

Appearance of reality in literature and theater

Verisimilitude (/ˌvɛrɪsɪˈmɪlɪtjuːd/) is the "lifelikeness" or believability of a work of fiction. The word comes from Latin: verum meaning truth and similis meaning similar. Language philosopher Steve Neale distinguishes between two types: cultural verisimilitude, meaning plausibility of the fictional work within the cultural and/or historical context of the real world, outside of the work; and generic verisimilitude, meaning plausibility of a fictional work within the bounds of its own genre (so that, for example, characters regularly singing about their feelings is a believable action within the fictional universe of a musical).

== Original roots ==
Verisimilitude has its roots in both the Platonic and Aristotelian dramatic theory of mimesis, the imitation or representation of nature. For a piece of art to hold significance or persuasion for an audience, according to Plato and Aristotle, it must have grounding in reality.

This idea laid the foundation for the evolution of mimesis into verisimilitude in the Middle Ages particularly in Italian heroic poetry. During this time more attention was invested in pinning down fiction with theory. This shift manifested itself in increased focus on unity in heroic poetry. No matter how fictionalized the language of a poem might be, through verisimilitude, poets had the ability to present their works in a way that could still be believed in the real world. Verisimilitude at this time also became connected to another Aristotelian dramatic principle, decorum: the realistic union of style and subject. Poetic language of characters in a work of fiction as a result had to be appropriate in terms of the age, gender or race of the character.

This classical notion of verisimilitude focused on the role of the reader in their engagement in the fictional work of art. The goal of the novel therefore, as it became a more popular form of verisimilitude, was to instruct and offer a pleasurable experience to the reader. The novel had to facilitate the reader's willingness to suspend their disbelief, a phrase used originally by Samuel Taylor Coleridge. Verisimilitude became the means to accomplish this mindset. To promote the willing suspension of disbelief, a fictional text needed to have credibility. Anything physically possible in the worldview of the reader or humanity's experience was defined as credible. Through verisimilitude then, the reader was able to glean truth even in fiction because it would reflect realistic aspects of human life.

== Continued evolution ==
The idea that credibility, and in turn verisimilitude, rested on the reader's sense of the world encountered opposition because of the dilemma it created: every reader and every person does not have the same knowledge of the world. This kind of theory suggests that the novel consisted of distinct parts. The way novelists avoided this dilemma initially was by adding a preface to the work of fiction stating its credibility or by including more references to known history within the text of the fiction.

As more criticism on the novel surfaced, the inclusion of a preface or a scattering of some historical references was not enough to engage the reader. French theorist Pierre Nicolas Desmolets' notion that the author should obscure the fiction or art of the novel to avoid destroying illusion: the made up attributes of the text. The novel before was perceived as a work of distinct parts. Now the novel was not thought of in terms of separate parts, but rather as a work as a whole. The novel was a total illusion of life within itself. It was a closed fictional world that could establish its own rules and laws. Verisimilitude then became deeply rooted in structure. The focus of credibility did not rest solely on the external world of the reader; the novel's credibility then could be seen in terms of the novel's own internal logic.

The focus of verisimilitude was no longer concerned with the reader. The focus shifted to the novel itself. Verisimilitude was a technical problem to resolve within the context of the novel's fictional world. Detail centered on the creation of a logical cause web in the text that then could reinforce the overarching structural logic of the plot.

== Postmodern perspective ==
During the rise of the postmodern novel, some critics suggested that truth or significance lies beyond verisimilitude and that only by complete non-discursive freedom to encounter a novel could meaning truly be discovered. Verisimilitude, they argued, was not the first aspect of the text a reader experiences. The reader instead first tries to observe if the novel works as an intelligible narrative. The lens of verisimilitude is applied only after the reader establishes if the novel makes sense or not.

The reader can understand the novel as art but not necessarily as a cultural construction. The novel should challenge the construction of reality. In this sense, it was possible for art to precede reality. Reality had to catch up to the text rather than text staying present to reality. A boundary existed establishing that text does not belong to a current time or situation. In the postmodern context, verisimilitude was less of a concern for the novelist according to some critics.

== Application of the concept in the arts ==
In the production of the superhero film Superman, director Richard Donner had a picture of the title character holding a sash with the word "verisimilitude" on it in his office during the project. That display was to remind Donner that he intended to approach the story of the fantasy superhero in a way true to the source material that would make it feel intuitively real to the audience within the context of the story's world. The result was a highly acclaimed film that would set the standard for a film genre that would become dominant decades later.

== See also ==
- Description
- Tiffany Problem
