= Tiffany (surname) =

Tiffany is a surname of English origin.

== Persons ==
- Members of the Tiffany family of jewelers:
  - Charles Lewis Tiffany (1812–1902), founder of Tiffany & Co.
  - Charles Comfort Tiffany (1829–1907), American Episcopal clergyman, a Tiffany cousin
  - Dorothy Burlingham-Tiffany (1891–1979), psychoanalyst, daughter of Louis Comfort Tiffany
  - Joseph Burr Tiffany, designer, nephew of Charles Lewis Tiffany
  - Louis Comfort Tiffany (1848–1933), stained glass artist and jewelry designer, son of Charles Lewis Tiffany
  - Consider Tiffany (1732-1796), British Loyalist and Shopkeeper
- Carrie Tiffany (born 1965), Australian novelist
- George Sylvester Tiffany (1805–1856), Canadian lawyer
- John Kerr Tiffany (1842–1897), of St. Louis, Missouri
- Lois H. Tiffany (1924–2009), American mycologist
- Robert Tiffany (1942–1993), British nurse
- Stanley Tiffany (1908–1971), English Labour Party politician, Member of Parliament (MP) for Peterborough (1945–1950)
- Tom Tiffany (born 1957), member of the U.S. House of Representatives from Wisconsin (2020–)

== See also ==
- Tiffany (given name)
- Tiphaine (disambiguation)
