= Tiffany Brooks =

Tiffany Brooks may refer to:

- Tiffany Brooks (baseball) (born 1977), American baseball player
- Tiffany Brooks (designer) (born 1979), American interior designer
