= Wade (film) =

- Directed by: Upamanyu Bhattacharyya; Kalp Sanghvi
- Written by: Upamanyu Bhattacharyya; Kalp Sanghvi
- Produced by: Upamanyu Bhattacharyya; Kalp Sanghvi; Arya Menon; Prateek Sethi; Paolo Polesello
- Music by: Troy Vasanth
- Production company: Ghost Animation
- Distributed by: Premium Films
- Release date: 24 October 2020
- Running time: 10 minutes 38 seconds
- Country: India
- Language: Silent

Wade is an Indian animated short film written and directed by Upamanyu Bhattacharyya and Kalp Sanghvi. It follows a group of climate change refugees in Kolkata, India, as they are attacked by an ambush of Royal Bengal Tigers. It imagines futures around sea level rise, global warming, ecological disruption and mass migration.

The film was made in Kolkata by Ghost Animation and premiered at the Annecy International Animation Festival 2020, where it won the City of Annecy Award.

== Premise ==
Kolkata, India, in the near future, has been badly affected by climate change and sea level rise. The floodwater has forced most people to move out of the city, turning it into a ghost town. The Sundarbans forest, just to the city's southern fringe, has also been devastated, forcing a lot of wildlife, including tigers, to move north into the shell of Kolkata.

However, a few people remain in the city, wading around, looking for sustenance. A family of climate change refugees arrive in a flooded Park Street, where they are attacked by a hungry tiger. While some are killed, the rest manage to flee into a building nearby, leaving behind a blind girl who uses a raft made of plastic bottles for her conveyance.

When a much larger ambush of tigers arrives on the scene, things begin to take a dark turn when both species go to extraordinary lengths to survive.

== Production ==
=== Writing ===
Writing began in April, 2016, in Mumbai. The film subsequently took inspiration from writings such as The Great Derangement by Amitav Ghosh and The Uninhabitable Earth by David Wallace-Wells. For reference for the background art, the crew took photographs in Park Street, Kumartuli, and Shovabazar in Kolkata. The crew made research trips to Alipore Zoo to study the movements of Royal Bengal Tigers.

=== Crowdfunding ===
In September 2016, the film ran a successful crowdfunding campaign on the Indian crowdfunding platform, Wishberry.

=== Animation ===
The film was animated on Adobe Photoshop, TVPaint and Krita. Production largely took place in the Ghost Animation studio in Kolkata, and the directors worked with a team of 30 artists. The film was made in a 4:3 aspect ratio to make the human-tiger standoff situations feel more 'claustrophobic'. The film was composited on Adobe AfterEffects. The sound design was executed on Ableton, and audio recordings took place in a river Vashind, Maharashtra, to add authenticity to the nature sounds and splashes.

== Festival screenings ==
'Wade' has played in numerous festivals globally, and also went on a domestic tour in India, playing in 23 venues across 8 cities.

	Festival	Country	Award	Result
2020	Annecy International Animation Festival	France	City of Annecy Award	Winner
2020	Fantasia International Film Festival	Canada	Satoshi Kon Award for Best Animated Short	Winner
2020	Odense International Film Festival	Denmark	Artist Award	Winner
2020	Palm Springs International Festival of Short Films	USA	Best Animated Short, Best of the Festival	Nominated
2020	Brooklyn Film Festival	USA	Audience Award	Winner
2020	Krakow Film Festival	Poland	Golden Dragon	Nominated
2020	Melbourne International Film Festival	Australia	City of Melbourne Award	Nominated
2020	Encounters Short Film and Animation Festival	UK	Animated Encounters Grand Prix	Nominated
2020	Animayo Film Festival	Gran Canaria	Best Art Direction	Winner
2020	Austin Film Festival	USA	Best Animated Short Film	Nominated
2020	Seoul International Cartoon and Animation Festival	South Korea	Best Animated Short Film	Nominated
2020	Manchester Animation Festival	UK	Best Animated Short Film	Nominated
2020	Vancouver International Film Festival	Canada	Best Animated Short Film	Nominated
2021	Atlanta Film Festival	USA	Best Animated Short Film	Nominated
