= Theophanu (disambiguation) =

Theophanu may refer to:

- Theophanu, consort of Otto II, Holy Roman Emperor (r. 967–983)
- Theophanu, Abbess of Essen from 1039 to 1058, granddaughter of Empress Theophanu and Otto II
