= Ciani Spillo =

Spillo

General information
- Type: Single seat competition glider
- National origin: Italy
- Manufacturer: SSVV (Sezioni Sperimentale di Volo a Vela), Milan
- Designer: Edgardo Ciani
- Number built: 1

History
- First flight: 1954

The Ciani EC.37/53 Spillo or SSVV EC.37/53 Spillo was a single seat competition glider designed and built in Italy in the 1950s. It had the highest aspect ratio wing of any wooden glider. Only one was built.

== Design and development ==
Edgardo Ciani's main aim when he designed the Spillo was to obtain good performance at the high speeds flown between thermals. Its fuselage was conventional for the time but the wing attracted a great deal of attention on account of its high aspect ratio of almost 30 and its thinness, only 15% of chord at the wing root. Like most glider wings of the early 1950s, it was an all wood structure and the Spillo had the highest aspect ratio wing of any wooded glider, pushing that technology to the limit. Chiani named it Spillo, (in English: pin), after its long, slender wing.

A difficulty with a thin, high aspect ratio wooden wing is that a very strong and therefore heavy spar is needed, with the result that the Spillo had the highest wing loading of any glider of its time. It used a single double box spar with thick laminated wood flanges and three vertical plywood webs. There were poplar ribs; the wing, including the ailerons was skinned with plywood, carefully smoothed and filled to follow accurately the NACA non-laminar flow airfoil. Upper surface hinged ailerons reached the wing tip and occupied about 36% of the span, though they were later slightly extended. In plan the wings were straight tapered, with a tip to root chord ratio of 0.30, ending with small, streamlined bodies known as salmons. Initially there were no flaps, but quarter span long gapless spoilers extended below the wing at mid-chord.

The rest of the Spillo was more conventional and the fuselage was similar to that of the CCV 7 Pinocchio, a tapering ply oval section monocoque with wooden frames and stringers and the high wing mounted immediately behind the short, high, single piece, side hinged canopy. For take-off the Spillo used a jettisonable wheel, landing on a small, thin, rubber sprung skid, extending from the nose to behind mid-chord and fitted with two vertical braking blades. At the rear, the tailplane was mounted on top of the fuselage; it was quite small, with strongly swept leading edges and tapered elevators split around the fin. The rudder was horn balanced and curved down to the keel behind a sloped straight leading edged rudder and fine.

Like other Ciani designs, the Spillo was built by Sezioni Sperimentale di Volo a Vela (SSVV), an offshoot of the Aeroclub Volovelistio Milanese. It first flew in 1954. In 1958 the wing trailing edge was modified, chiefly by the addition of camber changing plain flaps inboard of the ailerons which added low speed, thermalling lift as well as slowing landing approach speed. They could extend from +5° to −90°. At the same time the aileron span was increased by 11% and the wing area by 3.5%; the weight also increased slightly. In 350 hours of flying the undercarriage had twice been damaged in fast landings onto bumpy ground, so the skid was reinforced.

== Operational history ==
The most important event that the Spillo attended was the World Gliding Championships meeting held in 1954 at Camphill in the UK. The weather was wet and not suited to a glider designed for strong thermals and long cross-country flights and its pilot, R. Brigliadori, was one of many competitors able to score on only one of the four days. The flexibility of the Spillo's wings attracted interest and concern, though only its vulnerable skid was damaged. It later attended many other national and international competitions.

The Spillo achieved the excellent glide angles which Cani had aimed for, though he later thought he had overemphasised this aspect. The flaps helped with landings but the spoilers proved inefficient.

== Specifications (original configuration, no flaps) ==
Data from The World's Sailplanes

General characteristics

- Crew: One
- Length: 7.70 m (25 ft 3 in)
- Wingspan: 18.0 m (59 ft 1 in)
- Height: 1.1 m (3 ft 7 in) over cockpit
- Wing area: 10.97 m^{2} (118.1 sq ft)
- Aspect ratio: 29.6
- Airfoil: NACA 4415 at root, NACA 2R, 12 at tip.
- Empty weight: 270 kg (595 lb) equipped
- Gross weight: 360 kg (794 lb)

Performance

- Stall speed: 45 km/h (28 mph, 24 kn) Flaps down
- Never exceed speed: 200 km/h (120 mph, 110 kn) placard, smooth air
- Rough air speed max: 140 km/h (87.0 mph; 75.6 kn)
- Aerotow speed: 150 km/h (93.2 mph; 81.0 kn)
- g limits: +3.75 -?
- Maximum glide ratio: 38:1 at 101 km/h (62.8 mph; 54.5 kn). All specifications at a weight of 340 kg (750 lb)
- Rate of sink: 0.72 m/s (142 ft/min) minimum at 83 km/h (51.6 mph; 44.8 kn)
- Wing loading: 31.8 kg/m^{2} (6.5 lb/sq ft)
