= Tiffany Jackson =

Tiffany Jackson may refer to:

- Tiffany Jackson (basketball) (1985–2022), American basketball player and coach
- Tiffany Jackson (soprano), American jazz and operatic soprano
- Tiffany D. Jackson, American writer
