= Tiphaine =

Tiphaine is a francophone first name and last name.

- Tiphaine (given name)
- Tiphaine (surname)
