= Breakfast at Tiffany's =

Breakfast at Tiffany's may refer to:

- Breakfast at Tiffany's (novella), 1958 novella by Truman Capote
- Breakfast at Tiffany's (film), 1961
  - Breakfast at Tiffany's: Music from the Motion Picture, by Henry Mancini
- Breakfast at Tiffany's (musical), a 1966 Broadway musical
- Breakfast at Tiffany's (play), 2009 and 2016 (two different plays)
- "Breakfast at Tiffany's" (song), by Deep Blue Something, 1995

== See also ==
- Tiffany (disambiguation)
