= Luciani =

Luciani is an Italian surname. Notable people with the surname include:

- Albino Luciani (1912–1978), Italian pope of the Catholic Church (John Paul I)
- Alessio Luciani (born 1990), Italian footballer
- Antonino Riccardo Luciani (1931–2020), Italian classical composer and conductor
- Clara Luciani (born 1992), French musician
- Dante Luciani (born 1985), Canadian football wide receiver
- Franco Luciani (born 1981), Argentine musician and composer
- Giacomo Luciani, Italian expert on the geopolitics of energy
- Lucila Luciani de Pérez Díaz (1882–1971), Venezuelan historian, musician and feminist
- Luigi Luciani (1842–1919), Italian neuroscientist
- Luigi Luciani (footballer) (born 1996), Italian football player
- Marie-Ange Luciani (born 1979), French film producer
- Nicoletta Luciani (born 1979), Italian professional volleyball player
- Sebastiano Luciani (c. 1485–1547), Italian Renaissance-Mannerist painter, better known as Sebastiano del Piombo
