= Wades Branch =

Stream in Hickman County, Tennessee, U.S.

Coordinates: 35.7203467°N 87.5172379°W

Wades Branch is a stream in Hickman County, Tennessee, in the United States. It is a tributary to Beaverdam Creek.

Wades Branch was named for Robert Wade, who purchased the land on the creek in 1828.

== See also ==
- List of rivers of Tennessee
