= Waad =

Waad or WAAD may refer to:

- World Autism Awareness Day, annually on 2 April, declared by the United Nations
- Wa'ad or National Democratic Action Society, Bahrain's largest leftist political party

== Persons with the given name ==
- Waad Al Bahri (born 1981), Syrian singer
- Waad Hirmez (born 1961), Iraqi-American soccer player
- Waad Al-Kateab (born 1993), Syrian filmmaker and journalist

== Persons with the surname ==
- Armagil Waad (c. 1511–1568), English civil servant and parliamentarian
- William Waad (1546–1623), English statesman and diplomat
