= Ciani Crib =

Crib

General information
- Type: Single seat competition glider
- National origin: Italy
- Manufacturer: SSVV (Sezioni Sperimentale di Volo a Vela), Milan
- Designer: Edgardo Ciani
- Number built: 1

History
- First flight: 1966

The Ciani EC.41/64 Crib or SSVV EC.41/64 Crib was a single seat, high performance glider designed and built in Italy in the 1960s. Only one was built.

== Design and development ==
Edgardo Ciani's chief target with his Crib design was a glide angle of at least 35:1 using a wingspan of less than 18 m (59 ft 1 in). It had had a three-part wing, built around a single spar and covered with narrow poplar strips. The wing was high mounted and of constant taper plan with semi-elliptical tips. Ailerons filled most of the trailing edges of the outer panels and there were parallel ruler type airbrakes, extending above and below the wing, mounted at mid-chord towards the outer ends of the centre section.

The Crib's fuselage had an ovoid cross-section, narrowing slightly towards the tail. Its pilot sat ahead of the wing leading edge in a semi-reclining position under a single piece canopy that continued the smooth upper fuselage line. The straight tapered horizontal tail was mounted on top of the fuselage, with the elevators ahead of the rudder hinge. The port elevator carried a trim tab. The fin and rudder were both straight edged, round tipped and swept, with the rudder reaching down to the keel. The Crib had a semi-recessed fixed monowheel undercarriage, fitted with brakes and assisted by a skid with rubber shock absorbers and a shallow tail bumper.

The Crib, like Ciani's other designs, was built by the Sezioni Sperimentale di Volo a Vela (SSVV), an offshoot of Aeroclub Volovelistio Milanese, who completed it in the spring of 1966. It was hoped that small series production would result, but this did not happen.

== Specifications ==
Data from Italian Vintage Sailplanes

General characteristics

- Crew: One
- Length: 7.50 m (24 ft 7 in)
- Wingspan: 17.65 m (57 ft 11 in)
- Wing area: 15.50 m^{2} (166.8 sq ft)
- Aspect ratio: 20
- Airfoil: Eppler 257
- Empty weight: 240 kg (529 lb)
- Gross weight: 365 kg (805 lb)

Performance

- Maximum glide ratio: 35:1
- Wing loading: 23.50 kg/m^{2} (4.81 lb/sq ft)
