= Tiffany Montague =

Manager of Google's space initiatives

- Education: Smith College
- Employer: Google

Tiffany Montague was the manager of Google’s space initiatives. Her official position at Google was Intergalactic Federation King Almighty and Commander of the Universe.

== Early life ==
Montague grew up in the UK, travelling to the United States at age 16 to attend Smith College where she joined the Reserve Officers' Training Corps and Mensa.

== Work ==
After graduation, Montague served with the United States Air Force where she "had a down-looking sensor" and was mentored by Pete Worden, the head of NASA Ames, and at the National Reconnaissance Office.

Montague joined Google as a project manager c2005 and left in 2013.
