= Scientifica =

Company in United Kingdom

Scientifica Limited
- Company type: Public limited company since 2012 as constituent of Judges Scientific Plc, previously Private Limited Company
- Industry: Development and manufacturing of scientific instruments involved in neuroscience research notably including micromanipulators, microscopy rigs, mounting equipment and laboratory accessories. Major level markets include research and academia.
- Founded: 1997; 29 years ago
- Headquarters: Uckfield, East Sussex and Maidenhead, Berkshire, United Kingdom
- Area served: Worldwide
- Key people: Mark Johnson(Managing Director); Matthew Kemp(Sales and Marketing Manager)
- Products: Micromanipulators, microscopes, microscopy rigs, multiphoton imaging systems, scanners for use in medical and scientific laboratories.
- Revenue: £36 million (2013) (for parent group)

Scientifica is a constituent company of Judges Scientific Plc and was founded in 1997. The company is a manufacturer and supplier of laboratory instruments that include micromanipulators, imaging systems, complete microscopy rigs, mounting equipment for microscopes and related accessories for electrophysiology and two photon microscopy, used in laboratories worldwide including pharmaceutical companies, universities and medical research facilities.

== History ==
The company was the creation of former managing director Mark Johnson and his partner David Rogerson who purchased a subsidiary of Burleigh Inc.

In 2003 the company moved from being a distributor to a manufacturer of its own products. Their products are sold worldwide, including Europe, The United States of America (USA), Brazil, India, China, Korea, Singapore, Japan and Russia. The largest market is the United States but around thirty countries have bought Scientifica instruments.

== Philosophy ==
Johnson and Rogerson's motivation was to provide bespoke and well tested products to electrophysiology and imaging researchers. Electrophysiology is the study and measurement of the electrical properties of biological cells and tissues, and Scientifica's products are used extensively to broaden the understanding of the nervous and cardiac systems, particularly diseases that include: Alzheimers, Parkinsons and Epilepsy.

== Awards ==
- 2014 Queen's Awards For Enterprise: Innovation for their Multiphoton Imaging System
- 2013 Sussex Business Awards: International Business of the Year
- 2013 Made In The South East Manufacturer Of The Year (under 25 million turnover)
- 2012 Queens Award For Enterprise: International Trade

== Products ==
- Micromanipulators
- Complete microscopy rigs
- Multiphoton Imaging including resonant and galvo scanning
- Laser Applied Stimulating and Uncaging
- Mounting equipment and Imaging Platforms.
