= Wade (given name) =

Surname

- Pronunciation: we͡ɪd

Origin
- Origin: Middle English, Old English
- Meaning: "To go", "ford"
- Region of origin: England; East Anglia

Other names
- Variant forms: Waide, Waid, Wayde, Wadey, De la Wade, Waad, Wadeson, Waidson, Waythe, MacWade, MacUaid, MacQuaid, Quaid

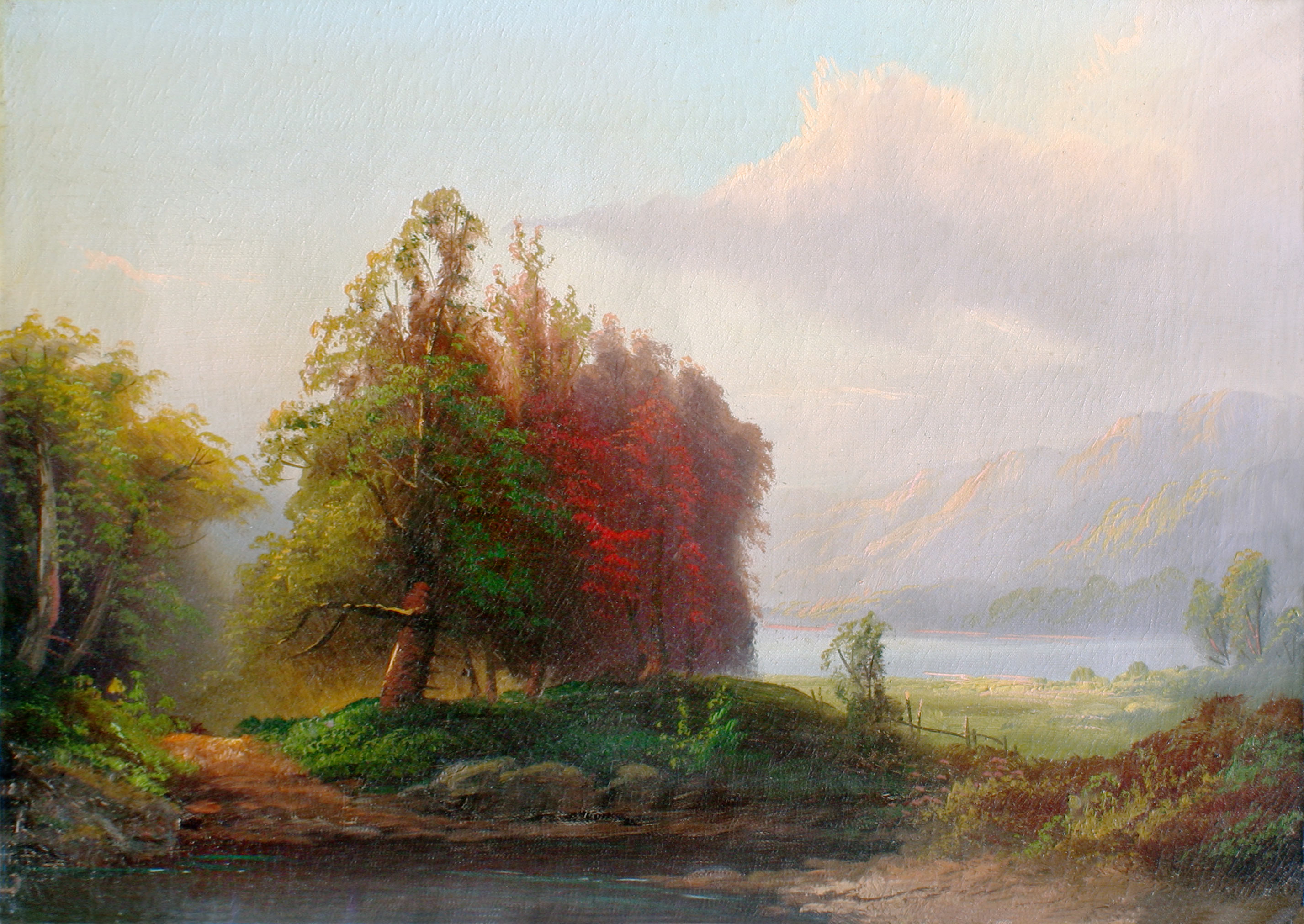
A ford in a 19th-century oil painting

Wade is a masculine given name of Anglo-Saxon English origin and derives from the pre–7th century Old English verb "wadan" (wada) meaning "to go", or as a habitational name from the Old English word "(ge)wæd" meaning "ford".

== Origins and variants ==
The given name Wade, was first recorded in the "little" Domesday Book for Norfolk, Suffolk, and Essex in 1086 as Wada, Wade and Wado, owing its popularity to the legend of Wade, a sea-giant, who was dreaded and honored by the coastal tribes of the North Sea and the Baltic Sea.

The Old English word (ge)wæd 'ford' may either be a topographical name to denote someone who lived by a ford, or a locational name from a place known as Wade, such as "Wade" in the county of Suffolk in East Anglia in the East of England.

== People ==
- Wade Allison (born 1941), British physicist and Oxford professor
- Wade Baldwin IV (born 1996), American basketball player
- Wade Barrett (born 1980), retired British professional wrestler
- Wade Belak (1976–2011), former National Hockey League player
- Wade Boggs (born 1958), former Major League Baseball player
- Wade Cunningham (born 1984), New Zealand race car driver
- Wade Davis (anthropologist) (born 1953), Canadian anthropologist, ethnobotanist, author and photographer
- Wade Davis (baseball) (born 1985), Major League Baseball pitcher
- Wade Guyton (born 1972), American artist
- Wade Hampton (disambiguation), various persons of that name
- Wade Hayes (born 1969), American country music artist
- Wade Helliwell, (born 1978) retired Australian basketball player
- Wade Houston, former collegiate basketball player and coach, father of former National Basketball Association player Alan Houston
- Wade MacNeil (born 1984), Canadian singer and guitarist of post-hardcore band Alexisonfire
- Wade Mainer (1907–2011), American singer and banjoist
- C. Wade Mcclusky (1902–1976), American aviator and Rear Admiral.
- Wade Meckler (born 2000), American baseball outfielder for the San Francisco Giants
- Wade Miley (born 1986), Major League Baseball pitcher
- Wade Ormsby (born 1980), Australian professional golfer
- Wade Phillips (born 1947), National Football League defensive coordinator and former head coach
- Wade Rathke (born 1948), co-founder of the Association of Community Organizations for Reform Now (ACORN)
- Wade Redden (born 1977), National Hockey League player
- Wade Regehr, Professor of Neurobiology in Harvard Medical School's Department of Neurobiology
- Wade Robson (born 1982), Australian dancer, director, producer, songwriter and choreographer
- Wade Sanders, former Deputy Assistant United States Secretary of the Navy for Reserve Affairs and sex offender
- Wade Schalles (born 1951), American champion amateur wrestler
- Wade Taylor IV (born 2003), American basketball player
- Wade Ward (1892–1971), American old-time music banjo player and fiddler
- Wade Watts (1919–1998), African American gospel preacher and civil rights activist
- Wade Williams (politician) (born 1973), American politician
- Wade Wilson (American football) (1959–2019), American football player and coach
- Wade Wilson (criminal) (born 1994), American murderer
- Wade Woodaz (born 2004), American football player

== Fictional characters ==
- Wade (folklore), in English folklore
- Wade Eiling, a DC Comics character
- Wade Whipple, a Sonic The Hedgehog film series character
- Wade Ripple, a Pixar character

== See also ==
- Wade (disambiguation)
- Wade (surname)
