= Realizational morphology =

Theory in linguistics

Realizational morphology or "word-and-paradigm" (WP) was a theory first created by linguist Charles F. Hockett. WP morphology focuses on the whole of a word rather than morphemes or internal structure. This theory also denies that morphemes are signs (form-content pairs). Instead, inflections are stem modifications which serve as exponents of morphological feature sets. It serves as an alternative for the Item-and-Arrangement (IA) and Item-and-Process (IP) Models.

The theory takes paradigms as a central notion. Instead of stating rules to combine morphemes into word-forms, or to generate word-forms from stems, word-based morphology states generalizations that hold between the forms of inflectional paradigms. The major point behind this approach is that many such generalizations are hard to state with either of the other approaches. The examples are usually drawn from fusional languages, where a given "piece" of a word, which a morpheme-based theory would call an inflectional morpheme, corresponds to a combination of grammatical categories, for example, "third person plural".

Morpheme-based theories analyze such cases by associating a single morpheme with two categories. Item-and-Process theories, on the other hand, often break down in cases like these, because they all too often assume that there will be two separate rules here, one for third person, and the other for plural, but the distinction between them turns out to be artificial. Word-and-Paradigm approaches treat these as whole words that are related to each other by analogical rules.

Words can be categorized based on the pattern they fit into. This applies both to existing words and to new ones. Application of a pattern different from the one that has been used historically can give rise to a new word, such as older replacing elder (where older follows the normal pattern of adjectival comparatives) and cows replacing kine (where cows fits the regular pattern of plural formation). While a Word-and-Paradigm approach can explain this easily, other approaches have difficulty with phenomena such as this.
