= Wade Township, Clinton County, Illinois =

Wade Township
- Township
- Location in Clinton County

- Clinton County's location in Illinois
- Coordinates: 38°41′38″N 89°25′40″W
- Country: United States
- State: Illinois
- County: Clinton
- Established: November 4, 1873

Area
  - Total: 28.9 sq mi (75 km^{2})
  - Land: 28.89 sq mi (74.8 km^{2})
  - Water: 0.02 sq mi (0.052 km^{2}) 0.07%
- Elevation: 446 ft (136 m)

Population (2020)
  - Total: 1,625
  - Density: 56.25/sq mi (21.72/km^{2})
- Time zone: UTC-6 (CST)
  - Summer (DST): UTC-5 (CDT)
- ZIP code: 62231
- FIPS code: 17-027-78344

Wade Township is one of fifteen townships in Clinton County, Illinois, United States. As of the 2020 census, its population was 1,625 and it contained 712 housing units. The township's name changed from Beaver Township on June 1, 1874.

== Geography ==
According to the 2010 census, the township has a total area of 28.9 square miles (75 km^{2}), of which 28.89 square miles (74.8 km^{2}) (or 99.97%) is land and 0.02 square miles (0.052 km^{2}) (or 0.07%) is water.

=== Cities, towns, villages ===
- Beckemeyer
- Carlyle (west edge)

=== Unincorporated towns ===
- Royal Lake Resort

(This list is based on USGS data and may include former settlements.)

=== Cemeteries ===
The township contains these two cemeteries: Beckemeyer and Saint Anthony.

== Demographics ==
As of the 2020 census there were 1,625 people, 714 households, and 483 families residing in the township. The population density was 56.21 inhabitants per square mile (21.70/km^{2}). There were 712 housing units at an average density of 24.63 per square mile (9.51/km^{2}). The racial makeup of the township was 92.62% White, 0.62% African American, 0.25% Native American, 0.55% Asian, 0.00% Pacific Islander, 1.66% from other races, and 4.31% from two or more races. Hispanic or Latino of any race were 4.00% of the population.

There were 714 households, out of which 29.70% had children under the age of 18 living with them, 58.82% were married couples living together, 5.88% had a female householder with no spouse present, and 32.35% were non-families. 26.80% of all households were made up of individuals, and 12.20% had someone living alone who was 65 years of age or older. The average household size was 2.69 and the average family size was 3.28.

The township's age distribution consisted of 22.7% under the age of 18, 7.1% from 18 to 24, 28.1% from 25 to 44, 23.9% from 45 to 64, and 18.1% who were 65 years of age or older. The median age was 39.7 years. For every 100 females, there were 96.3 males. For every 100 females age 18 and over, there were 102.7 males.

The median income for a household in the township was $62,500, and the median income for a family was $72,599. Males had a median income of $37,350 versus $28,958 for females. The per capita income for the township was $24,637. About 2.1% of families and 5.7% of the population were below the poverty line, including 0.5% of those under age 18 and 4.6% of those age 65 or over.

Historical population
Census	Pop.	Note	%±
2010	1,717		—
2020	1,625		−5.4%
U.S. Decennial Census

== School districts ==
- Carlyle Community Unit School District 1

== Political districts ==
- Illinois' 19th congressional district
- State House District 102
- State Senate District 51
