= Theophano =

Theophano (Θεοφανώ) may refer to:

- Theophano of Athens (died after 811), consort of Staurakios (r. 811)
- Theophano Martinakia (866/67–897), first consort of Leo VI the Wise (r. 886–912)
- Theophano (born Anastaso) (c. 941 – after 978), consort of Romanos II (r. 959–963) and Nikephoros II (r. 963–969)

== See also ==
- Theophanu (disambiguation)
