= Typhaine case =

2009 child abuse case in France

Typhaine Taton
- Born: April 6, 2004; Maubeuge, France
- Died: June 8, 2009 (aged 5); Maubeuge, France
- Cause of death: Blunt force trauma
- Body discovered: December 9, 2009
- Parent(s): François Taton; Anne-Sophie Faucheur

The Typhaine case, or "case of Typhaine Taton", was a case of child abuse and child murder that occurred in France in 2009.

5-year-old Typhaine Taton was reported missing by her mother on 18 June 2009 in Maubeuge, in the Nord département of northern France. The mother (Anne-Sophie Faucheur) and her partner (Nicolas Willot) admitted to Typhaine's murder five months later after being arrested and remanded in custody. Their reason was a violent punishment gone wrong due to Typhaine "wetting her bed, stealing sweets and taking too long to go to sleep". The investigation revealed that Typhaine had been mistreated in the period before her murder. The authorities had begun to suspect the couple of the murder several months before they confessed. Typhaine's body was found in Belgium, so initial investigations were led by local police there.

Faucheur and Willot were sentenced to 30 years' imprisonment by the Court of Assizes in Douai.

== Typhaine's biography and family situation ==
Typhaine Taton was born in 2004 to Anne-Sophie Faucheur and François Taton. Her mother was 18 at the time of her birth. She had an older sister, Caroline, born in 2003. At her trial, Faucheur testified that Typhaine "was unwanted" as a baby, that her relationship with Typhaine had been "strained ever since she was born", and that she "slightly rejected" her daughter.

Typhaine's parents divorced in December 2005. In 2006, Faucheur met Willot, a volunteer firefighter. The new couple took custody of Typhaine and Caroline, who had previously been living with their grandmother. At this time, Typhaine did not know her mother and called her "Madame".

On 22 January 2009, after Faucheur had just given birth to her third child, she withdrew Typhaine from the "Florian" kindergarten in Faches-Thumesnil. At this time, the family was living in Aulnoye-Aymeries. Typhaine was increasingly mistreated after being taken into her mother's custody.

One of Typhaine's paternal aunts managed to see her on 11 April 2009, and found that she had transformed dramatically. Typhaine originally had long blonde hair, but the missing-person notice issued after her disappearance described her hair as short and chestnut-brown. Typhaine's mother is believed to have dyed and cut her daughter's hair. The same aunt also stated that Typhaine had lost weight, her face was thinner and she looked tired.

According to the media, Typhaine had been punished by a cold shower for having wet her bed and stolen sweets. Her inability to sleep is believed to have been the catalyst for her murder. While she was being mistreated, she lived "in the basement, on the stairs, in the dark," sometimes "tied to the staircase handrail" after becoming hungry, to prevent her from stealing cake.

== Timeline of events ==
=== Disappearance reported ===
On 18 June 2009 in Maubeuge, Typhaine Taton's mother reported her missing, claiming that she had last seen her daughter at the Place de Wattignies, a square in the town. An abduction investigation was then launched. The next day, Typhaine's mother and stepfather were arrested, but were released later that evening.

Eight days later, the mother claimed that Typhaine had been absent from the baptism of her half-sister Apolline, which had taken place on 13 June. By 10 July, the police's hypothesis was that Typhaine had disappeared before 18 June. A few days later, her mother claimed to be "holding out hope". In September, the mother, stepfather and his family were recognised as civil parties in the case.

=== The search ===
On 18 June, Maubeuge had been hosting a cultural festival, until the news of Typhaine's disappearance from Avenue Mabuse brought festivities to a halt at 5:30 p.m.

Typhaine was described as having "bobbed chestnut-brown hair, measuring 1.10 metres (3 ft 7) tall, and wearing red trainers and a pink Dora the Explorer t-shirt".

As soon as her disappearance was announced, "significant search efforts were mobilised: the river Sambre was searched, as were trains and buses, due to the place of disappearance being close to the railway station." Searches were led by the national and local police, the fire brigade, local officials and members of the public. Divers from Valenciennes found nothing in the river, while a search of the area using specialist dogs was also fruitless.

While searches were being carried out in Maubeuge, investigators searched the home of Anne-Sophie Faucheur and her partner in Aulnoye-Aymeries. Prosecutor Bernard Beffy did not issue an abduction alert because there was no "indisputable evidence that an abduction had taken place". The same day, the investigators learned of the animosity between Typhaine's mother and father.

Local newspaper La Voix du Nord ("The Voice of the North") wrote: "Tongues are being loosened in the families in both Mons-en-Barœul and Aulnoye-Aymeries. An abduction investigation has been launched without anyone checking whether it might be an accident or a family affair. The file is being transferred to senior investigators in Valenciennes. The Sambre is being searched. The father's family have put up dozens of posters on the streets on Maubeuge."

National news magazine Le Nouvel Observateur added: "On 24 June, less than a week later, Typhaine's mother and her partner went as far as organising a press conference to broadcast their anxiety and appeal for witnesses. 'We still know nothing today. We miss Typhaine, she will be found, we're sure of it,' the young woman said. 'We feel empty, powerless,' she continued, expressing her regret that no abduction alert had been issued, while continuing to insist that it was a kidnapping."

=== The mother's confession ===
On 30 November 2009, the mother was once again remanded in custody and confessed to being responsible for the death of her daughter in early June 2009. The following day, she was charged with unintentionally causing the death of a minor under 15 years of age, contrary to Article 222-7 of the French Penal Code. On 2 December, she was additionally charged with murder after her partner confessed to burying Typhaine in Belgium.

Typhaine is believed to have died on either 10 or 11 June 2009 following a punishment gone wrong, and buried on either 15 or 16 June 2009, shortly before her alleged disappearance was announced. According to news magazine Paris Match: "Trapped by their own crime, Anne-Sophie and Nicolas hid the body in the basement for two days before launching a macabre plot. Once the body was buried in the forest, the couple reported the child's disappearance and had everyone believe that she had been abducted on the street in broad daylight. They lied to the police and the media for months."

=== Discovery of the body, post-mortem and funeral ===
On 9 December 2009, Typhaine's naked body was discovered buried in a forest in the village of Loverval, in the province of Hainaut, Belgium. She was identified by the Belgian police's disaster victims identification team. The Belgian authorities initially led the investigation, and Belgian doctors carried out a post-mortem on Typhaine on 10 December.

The post-mortem revealed that Typhaine had been mistreated and had suffered nine traumatic impacts. "Two blows to the head; a fractured pelvis, left leg and left elbow; the pubis was shattered, including the gluteal muscles; and the skull was fractured in two places. The rib cage was also fractured; and the leg fracture was healing at the time of her death, which showed that it was not the first time the girl had been beaten. The stomach, which was intact, was empty," but "in an advanced state of decomposition," making it "impossible to determine the cause of death."

Typhaine Taton was buried on 29 December 2009 at the cemetery in Mons-en-Barœul. The funeral was attended by her father's side of the family.

=== The trial ===
The trial was held in January 2013, more than three years after the events, at the Court of Assizes in Douai.

Typhaine's mother claimed that she wanted to "hurt her," but that "Typhaine didn't deserve that." Typhaine suffered "slaps, spankings, punches, belt lashes and kicks" while she remained "withdrawn and unresponsive". Anne-Sophie Faucheur described herself as a "monster" but refused to apologise on the pretext that her actions were unforgivable. She also added that her daughter "begged for her granny and snapped when asked to do things," that she "glared" and that she "thought that she was provoking her mother". Typhaine was beaten "almost every day" and her mother "did not feel like her mother." Typhaine was also kicked while her attackers were wearing shoes. Her last words were apparently, "I'm sorry Mummy."

During the trial, the stepfather claimed that he wanted to "make Typhaine happy".

Typhaine's mother and stepfather were sentenced to 30 years' imprisonment, of which they must serve at least 20 years before being able to challenge the rest of the sentence.

== Consequences ==
=== Criticism of reactions ===
==== Media ====
On 29 June 2009, television station France 3 broadcast false news that Typhaine Taton's body had been found underwater. This piece of information had been provided by a fake journalist. The channel filed a criminal complaint.

==== Public authorities ====
Typhaine Taton was not enrolled at a school at the time of her death. Jean-Phillippe Broyart, a lawyer for the association Enfance et Partage ("Childhood and Sharing"), stated that this was not illegal but rather a legal loophole, as schooling is not compulsory in France until the child turns six years old. He said, "after her mother took her when she was five, Typhaine was taken out of school for months without anyone - or almost anyone - asking questions." Jean-Christophe Boyer, a lawyer for the association L'Enfant bleu ("The Blue Child", an organisation advocating for abused children), agreed and said, "if she had gone to school, the abuse would have been noticed." Furthermore, the school that Typhaine previously attended waited until June - the month of her death - before notifying the authorities of her absence.
