= Tiffany Cianci =

American influencer and activist

- Born: Tiffany Dawn Cianci; November 25, 1981 (age 44); Nevada, U.S.
- Education: University of Nevada, Las Vegas
- Occupation: Influencer

TikTok information
- Page: tiffanycianci
- Followers: 286.2k

Tiffany Dawn Cianci (born November 25, 1981), also known as Tiffany Dawn Soto, is an American influencer, activist, and former business owner. She is known as a host and organizer for livestream events, for her criticism of private equity, and for her legal dispute against the private equity group Unleashed Brands.

== Biography ==
Tiffany Cianci was born on November 25, 1981, in San Diego and grew up as a foster child. She attended the University of Nevada, Las Vegas, where she majored in advertising.

Following graduation, Cianci worked in the hospitality industry in Maryland. In 2014, Cianci brought a lawsuit against her then-employer, the Four Seasons Baltimore, where she alleged that she had faced harassment and gender discrimination condoned by the Four Seasons. Cianci and the Four Seasons eventually reached a settlement.

In 2017, Cianci left the hospitality industry and opened a children's fitness facility franchised through The Little Gym. In 2021, The Little Gym was acquired by Unleashed Brands. The acquisition led to a disagreement between Cianci and Unleashed, and her franchise was terminated in 2022, which she alleged was done in response to helping form a franchisee association. Cianci attempted to independently operate her gym and was sued by Unleashed for illegally continuing to use branding and intellectual property from The Little Gym. The dispute went to private arbitration, resulting in a mixed ruling in June 2023, which is currently under appeal.

In 2023, Cianci acted as a host and organizer for livestreamed events, facilitating a public conversation with Robert F. Kennedy Jr. about her lawsuit and experience with the private equity industry. Clips of which were posted by the Kennedy Campaign on social media. Following this, Cianci managed logistics and hosted several additional livestream events featuring Kennedy and with other creators.

Cianci has garnered 286,000 followers and 3.5 million likes on TikTok. In 2024 and 2025, she gained additional popularity for her activism against the proposed ban of TikTok, where she conducted a livestream outside of a courthouse during a hearing on the proposed ban.

=== Legal cases ===
In 2014, Cianci was sued by her former landlord over unpaid rent, and an initial ruling awarded the landlord $27,384. However, this judgement for attorney's fees was overturned on appeal in 2016 by the Maryland Court of Special Appeals.

On July 6, 2022, The Little Gym International sued Cianci, alleging she continued to use their branding and intellectual property after her franchise was terminated. The Little Gym also alleged that Cianci used derogatory and misogynistic language to describe a customer. In September 2022, the case was moved into private arbitration in Arizona.

On June 8, 2023, the arbiter issued a ruling. It found that Cianci's franchise termination was justified, that she illegally used The Little Gym's intellectual property, and that she would be unable to operate a non-affiliated gym in competition with The Little Gym. However, the arbiter simultaneously ruled that The Little Gym engaged in intentional defamation against Cianci, designating her as a prevailing party on that count. The case is currently under appeal.
