= Ciani Urendo =

Urendo
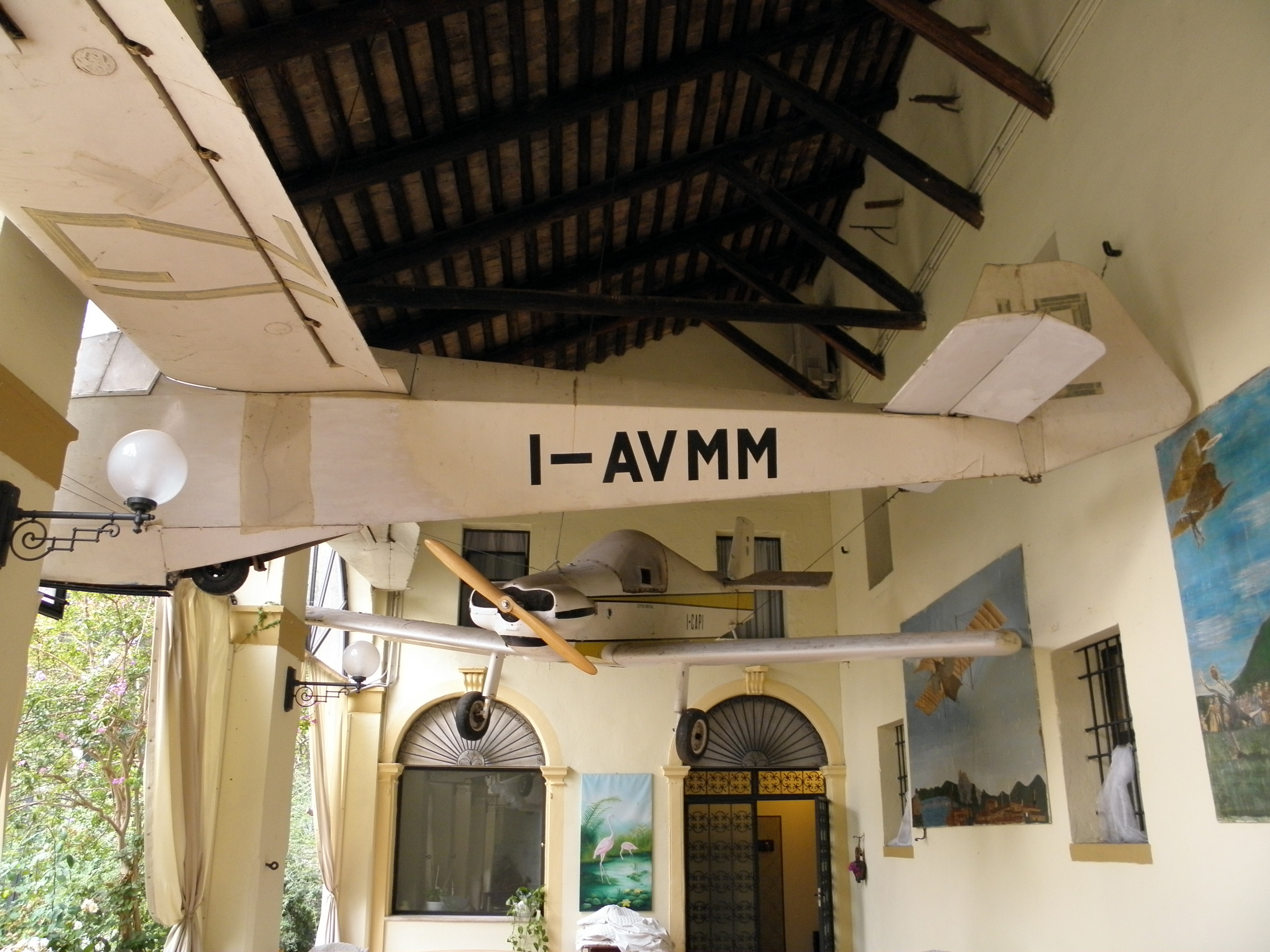
- The EC 38/56 Urendo displayed at Museo dell'aria e dello spazio of San Pelagio, Due Carrare, Province of Padua

General information
- Type: Two seat glider
- National origin: Italy
- Manufacturer: SSVV (Sezioni Sperimentale di Volo a Vela), Milan
- Designer: Edgardo Ciani
- Number built: 4

History
- First flight: 22 June 1956

The Ciani EC 38/56 Urendo, or SSVV EC 38/56 Urendo is an Italian tandem-seat training glider from the 1950s. Four were built, one winning the Italian National Championships in 1959. Another, restored, still flies.

== Design and development ==
Like his other designs, Edgardo Ciani's Urendo was built by Sezioni Sperimentale di Volo a Vela (SSVV) of Milan, an offshoot of the Aeroclub Volovelistio Milanese. It was intended as a general-purpose (including training), low-cost aircraft, and the necessary simplicity of its construction was apparent in its flat-sided fuselage. It is said that when Ciani saw it in the air for the first time, he exclaimed "Ma l'é propri Urend!" ("By God, it's really horrible!" in the Milanese dialect) and named it Urendo (horrendous). Nonetheless, it has an efficient laminar flow wing, and, though its thermalling is limited with two aboard by a high wing loading, it flies well cross-country as a single-seater.

The flying surfaces of the Urendo are almost entirely wooden, apart from fabric-covered rear control surfaces and fibre-glass aileron nose-caps. Its high set wing, mounted with 3.50° of dihedral, is built around a single spar and plywood-skinned. In plan the wing is straight-edged, with an inner panel of constant chord and 4.50° of forward sweep at quarter chord, and outer, tapered panels with forward sweep of 3°, terminating in small, streamlined bodies known as salmons. The three Urendo variants were distinguished by the details of the ailerons on the outer panels, the airbrakes, also on the outer panels but at their inboard limit, and the presence or absence of centre section flaps.

The Urendo's fuselage is steel-framed and fabric-covered. Behind the wings it has a kite shaped cross-section, the longer sides reaching down to the keel. The tail surfaces are straight-edged, with a parallel chord tailplane and elevators mounted forward of the fin and on top of the fuselage. The fin and rudder are straight-tapered with a squared-off top, the latter extending down to the keel. Forward, the fuselage section becomes hexagonal and deeper, with the tandem seats under a starboard side hinged, long, flat-sided, flat-topped and multi-part canopy. This hinged part ends at the wing leading edge, but fixed glazing carries the canopy back further, where it merges into the dorsal fuselage. The Urendo lands on a fixed, semi-recessed monowheel, fitted with a brake and placed towards the rear of a substantial, rubber-mounted curved main skid. There is a small tail skid.

The Urendo flew for the first time on 22 June 1956.

== Operational history ==
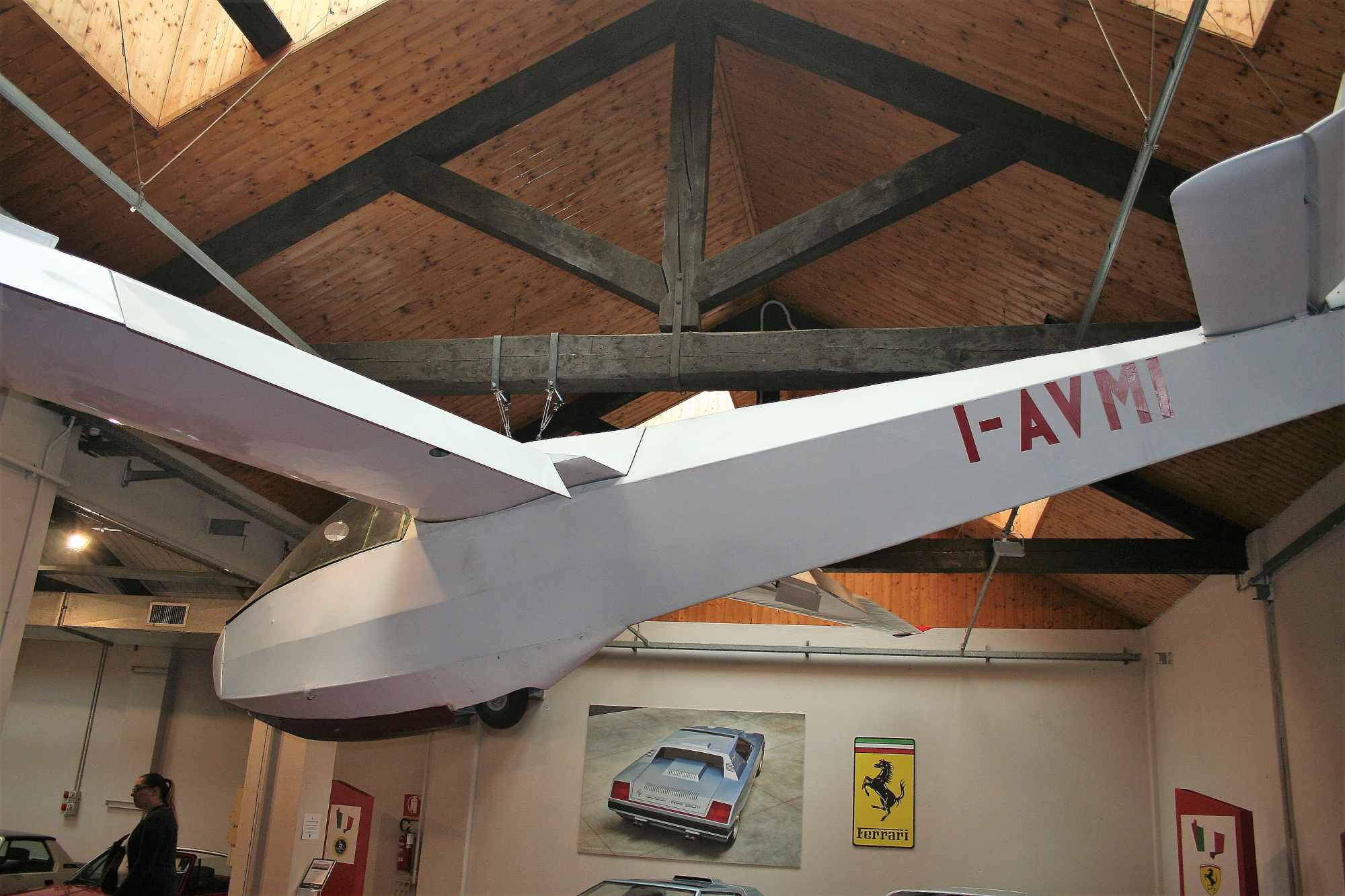
I-AVMI in the Bertone Museum at Volandia outside Milano.

Four Urendos were built, one without flaps and the other three as types B and C. It was agreed that each modification of the ailerons provided an improvement in control. Opinion differed on the effectiveness of the flaps, intended to help with take-offs and improve thermalling performance. The airbrakes were generally seen as very effective, providing landing descent rates of 6–7 m/s (20–23 ft/s).

Unexpectedly, a Urendo flown solo won the Italian National Gliding Championships in 1959, achieving the longest-distance cross-country flight there of 297 km (185 mi). It returned good performances in several other national competitions.

I-AVMI, a type B Urendo, was quite recently discovered stored on an Italian farm and returned to the air.

== Variants ==
Type A
Airbrakes mounted close to trailing edge. No flaps. Ailerons with upper surface hinges.
Type B
Airbrakes further forward. Slotted flaps with deflections between +5° and -50°. Ailerons as type A but slightly lengthened (11%) and hinges sealed.
Type C
Airbrakes further forward still, near mid-chord. Flaps as type B. Ailerons as type A, lengthened but with lower surface shrouds.

== Specifications (Type A) ==
Data from The World's Sailplanes:Die Segelflugzeuge der Welt:Les Planeurs du Monde Volume II All performance figures are with one pilot, aircraft weight 330 kg (728 lb), year old type A, though the full specifications include a lower stall speed with flaps down, whereas the Type A did not have flaps.

General characteristics

- Crew: Two maximum, one for these figures
- Length: 6.92 m (22 ft 8 in)
- Wingspan: 15.0 m (49 ft 3 in)
- Height: 1.30 m (4 ft 3 in) at cockpit
- Wing area: 13.8 m^{2} (149 sq ft)
- Aspect ratio: 16.2
- Airfoil: NACA 64_{3}618 root and mid-wing, NACA 747 A 315 tip
- Empty weight: 235 kg (518 lb)
- Gross weight: 395 kg (871 lb)

Performance

- Stall speed: 57 km/h (35 mph, 31 kn) approximately; no flaps
- Never exceed speed: 200 km/h (120 mph, 110 kn) placard, smooth air
- Rough air speed max: 140 km/h (87.0 mph; 75.6 kn)
- Aerotow speed: 150 km/h (93.2 mph; 81.0 kn)
- Terminal velocity: with full airbrakes 170 km/h (106 mph; 92 kn)
- Maximum glide ratio: 24.7:1 at 86 km/h (53.4 mph; 46.4 kn)
- Rate of sink: 0.87 m/s (171 ft/min) minimum, at 68 km/h (42.3 mph; 36.7 kn)
- Wing loading: 28.6 kg/m^{2} (5.9 lb/sq ft) two up

<
