= Trương =

Vietnamese surname

- Chữ Hán for Trương
- Pronunciation: [t̠͡ʂɯ̄ɤŋ] [cɯ̄ɤŋ]~[͡ʧɯ̄ɤŋ] (Northern dialect only)
- Language: Vietnamese

Origin
- Meaning: drawing a bow, archer, bowyer, a measure word

Other names
- Variant forms: Chang, Zhang (Mandarin); Cheung (Hong Kong); Cheong (Macao, Malaysia); Tsan, Tsaon (Shanghai); Teo, Teoh (Hokkien, Teochew); Chong, Cheong (Hakka); Cheong (Gan); Trang (Vietnamese); Jang, Chang (장) (Korean)

Trương (Vietnamese pronunciation: [t̠͡ʂɯɤŋ]) or Truong is a Vietnamese surname.

Individuals with the surname Trương make up approximately 2.2% of the population and rank eighth on the list of the most common surnames in Vietnam. They are primarily of Kinh ethnicity (Vietnamese people) but also include people from the Chinese, Cham, Tho, and San Diu ethnic groups in Vietnam.

== Origin ==
The Vietnamese surname Trương derives from the Chinese surname Zhang, both written in the Han script as 張. Zhang is the third most common Chinese surname in China and fourth in Taiwan.

== Notable people with the surname ==
- André Truong Trong Thi (1936–2005), Vietnamese-French engineer, called the "father of the personal computer"
- Doris Truong, president of the Asian American Journalists Association
- Hieu C. Truong (born 1941), Vietnamese Canadian engineer
- Kaylynne Truong (born 2001), Vietnamese-American basketball player
- Monique Truong (born 1968), writer
- Paul Truong (born 1965), American chess player, trainer, and organizer
- Trương Bửu Diệp (1897–1946), Vietnamese Catholic priest
- Trương Định (1820–1864), Nguyễn Dynasty mandarin
- Trương Đình Dzu, lawyer and politician
- Trương Hòa Bình First Deputy Prime Minister of the Socialist Republic of Vietnam
- Truong Dinh Tuyen, Minister of Trade of Vietnam
- Trương Gia Bình, businessman
- Trương Tấn Sang, former State President of Vietnam
- Trương Mỹ Hoa, former Vice State President of Vietnam
- Truong Ngoc Anh, Vietnamese model and actress
- Trương Như Tảng, lawyer and politician
- Trương Tấn Bửu, general and official of the Nguyễn Dynasty
- Trương Văn Cam or Năm Cam, Vietnamese gangster
- Trương Vĩnh Ký (1837–1898), 19th century Vietnamese Catholic who served the French colonial regime
- Truong Vinh Trong, Deputy Prime Minister of Vietnam
