= Theo =

Theo is a given name and a hypocorism.

== Greek origin ==
Many names beginning with the root Theo- derive from the Ancient Greek word theos (θεός), which means God, for example:

- Feminine names: Thea, Theodora, Theodosia, Theophania, Theophano and Theoxena
- Masculine names: Theodore, Theodoros/Theodorus, Theodosius, Theodotus, Theophanes, Theophilus, Theodoret and Theophylact

== Germanic origin ==
Many other names beginning with "Theo-" do not necessarily derive from Greek, but rather the old Germanic "theud", meaning "people" or "folk". These names include:

- Theobald, Theodahad, Theodard, Theodebert, Theodemir, and Theodoric

== People with the name Theo ==
See Theo and Théo for a current alphabetical list of all people with the first name Theo or Théo in the English Wikipedia.

Among better known people with this name are:

- Theo Adam (1926–2019), German classical bass-baritone
- Theo Albrecht (1922–2010), German entrepreneur and billionaire
- Theo Angelopoulos (1935–2012), Greek filmmaker, screenwriter and film producer
- Theo Avgerinos (born 1978), American film director
- Theo Benedet (born 2001), Canadian American football player
- Theo Bos (born 1983), Dutch road and track cyclist, five-time world champion
- Theo van Doesburg (1883–1931), Dutch artist, founder and leader of the De Stijl art movement
- Theo Epstein (born 1973), American baseball executive, three-time World Series champion
- Theo Fleury (born 1968), Canadian ice hockey player
- Theo Geisel (1904–1991), American author better known as Dr. Seuss
- Theo van Gogh (art dealer) (1857–1891), brother and supporter of painter Vincent van Gogh
- Theo van Gogh (film director) (1957–2004), Dutch film director, great-grandson of the above
- Théo Golliard (born 2002), Swiss footballer
- Theo Grant (born 2000), Canadian football player
- Theo Heemskerk (1852–1932), Dutch Prime Minister
- Théo Hernandez (born 1997), French footballer
- Theo Hutchcraft (born 1986), English singer and songwriter
- Theo Jackson (disambiguation), multiple people
- Theo James (born 1984), English actor
- Theo Jansen (born 1948), Dutch artist and kinetic sculptor
- Theo Janssen (born 1981), Dutch footballer
- Theo Johnson (born 2001), Canadian American football player
- Theo Jörgensmann (1948–2025), German jazz clarinetist and composer
- Théo Lefèvre (1914–1973), Belgian Prime Minister
- Theo Lingen (1903–1978), German actor, film director and screenwriter
- Théo Lucien (born 2001), French taekwondo practitioner
- Theo Mackeben (1897–1953), German composer and conductor
- Theo Melin Öhrström, Swedish-American football player
- Theo Osterkamp (1892–1975), German flying ace in both World War I and World War II
- Theo Pabst (1905–1979), German architect
- Theo Pelouze (1807–1867), French chemist
- Theo de Raadt (born 1968), South African-born Canadian founder and leader of the OpenBSD and OpenSSH projects
- Theo Ratliff (born 1973), American basketball player (Theophalus)
- Theo Rossi (born 1975), American actor and producer
- Théo van Rysselberghe (1862–1926), Belgian neo-impressionist painter
- Théo Sarapo (1936–1970), French singer and actor, husband of Édith Piaf
- Theo Smyrnaeus (fl. 100 CE), Greek philosopher and mathematician (Theon)
- Theo Sommer (1930–2022), German newspaper editor and intellectual
- Theo Stevenson (born 1998), British actor
- Theo Timmer (born 1949), Dutch motorcycle racer
- Theo Timmermans (footballer born 1926), Dutch footballer
- Theo Timmermans (born 1989), Dutch footballer
- Theo Von (born 1980), American stand-up comedian, television personality, host, and actor
- Theo Waigel (born 1939), German politician, known as the father of the Euro
- Theo Walcott (born 1989), English footballer
- Theo Wease Jr. (born 2001), American football player
- Theo Zagorakis (born 1971), Greek footballer and politician
- Theo (born 2005), formerly known as Theoz, Swedish influencer and singer
- Theø, member of Italian band La Sad and formerly of Upon This Dawning

== Surname ==
- Michael Theo (born 1981), Australian soccer player

== Fictional characters ==
- Theo, the self-proclaimed 'King of All the Land', protagonist of Ultra Jump Mania and Tari's first companion in the Meta Runner web series
- Theo Decker, main character in Donna Tartt's novel The Goldfinch
- Theo Faron, the main character in P.D. James's 1992 novel The Children of Men and of the 2006 film Children of Men based on the novel
- Theo (Celeste), a character in the video game Celeste
- Theo Fobius, in the webcomic Schlock Mercenary
- Theo Huxtable, in the sitcom The Cosby Show
- Theo, a character in the animated television series Looped
- Theo Kojak, lead character of the Kojak television series
- Theo Lion, a character from the children's television series Between the Lions
- Theo Raeken, a fictional character in the 2011-2017 TV series Teen Wolf
- Theo Saville, one of the main characters on the television series A Million Little Things, son of Eddie and Katherine

== See also ==
- Teo (disambiguation)
- THEO (Testing the Habitability of Enceladus's Ocean), a spacecraft mission to Enceladus
- Teo (given name)
- Teo (surname)
