= Murder of Dini Haryati =

1998 unsolved rape-murder of an Indonesian student at Singapore

Dini Haryati
- Dini Haryati, pictured before her death
- Born: Dini Haryati; 10 February 1978; Jakarta, Indonesia
- Died: 4 January 1998 (aged 19); Woodlands, Singapore
- Cause of death: Murdered
- Education: Bandung Tourism College - Hotel management diploma
- Occupations: Student; Hotel receptionist (intern)
- Employer: Albert Court Hotel (before her death)
- Known for: Murder victim

On 6 January 1998, two days after she went missing, the semi-naked corpse of 19-year-old Dini Haryati, an Indonesian student and intern hotel receptionist working in Singapore, was discovered in a forest at Woodlands, with injuries to her head, abdomen and neck. An autopsy report revealed that Dini had been raped before she died from a skull fracture. The police conducted extensive investigations to solve the case and sought information on any suspects behind the brutal rape-murder, which shocked the nation at that time. However, due to a lack of clues and suspects, the murder remains unsolved.

== Background ==
Dini Haryati was born in Jakarta, Indonesia on 10 February 1978. Dini, who grew up in a rich and affluent family, had a younger twin sister (born 15 minutes later than Dini) and two older brothers. Her father, Ustam Dinata, was a banker working at Bank Bukopin in Jakarta. Dini was an enthusiast in karate and taekwondo, and had achieved a black belt in both sports. She was also a studious and hard-working student and able to speak many different languages, and had mastered Indonesian cultural dance skills. Dini's uncle stated that his niece was very obedient and was a mature and independent child despite her wealthy background.

Dini studied up to high school and later completed a two-year hotel management diploma course with the Bandung Tourism College. In August 1997, Dini was transferred to Singapore for a six-month training programme at the Albert Court Hotel in Albert Street, where she worked as a hotel receptionist. Her colleagues described her as a hard-working co-worker and pleasant person. Dini rented a flat with two friends at Woodlands, and her residence was located nearby the Woodlands MRT station. Dini would maintain contact with her family through letters and phone calls. Dini also made plans to further her studies in university and her father had made arrangements for her to travel to Sydney, Australia to attend a university there. Dini also expressed her hope to return to Indonesia after finishing her studies to work in the local hotel industry.

== Rape and murder ==
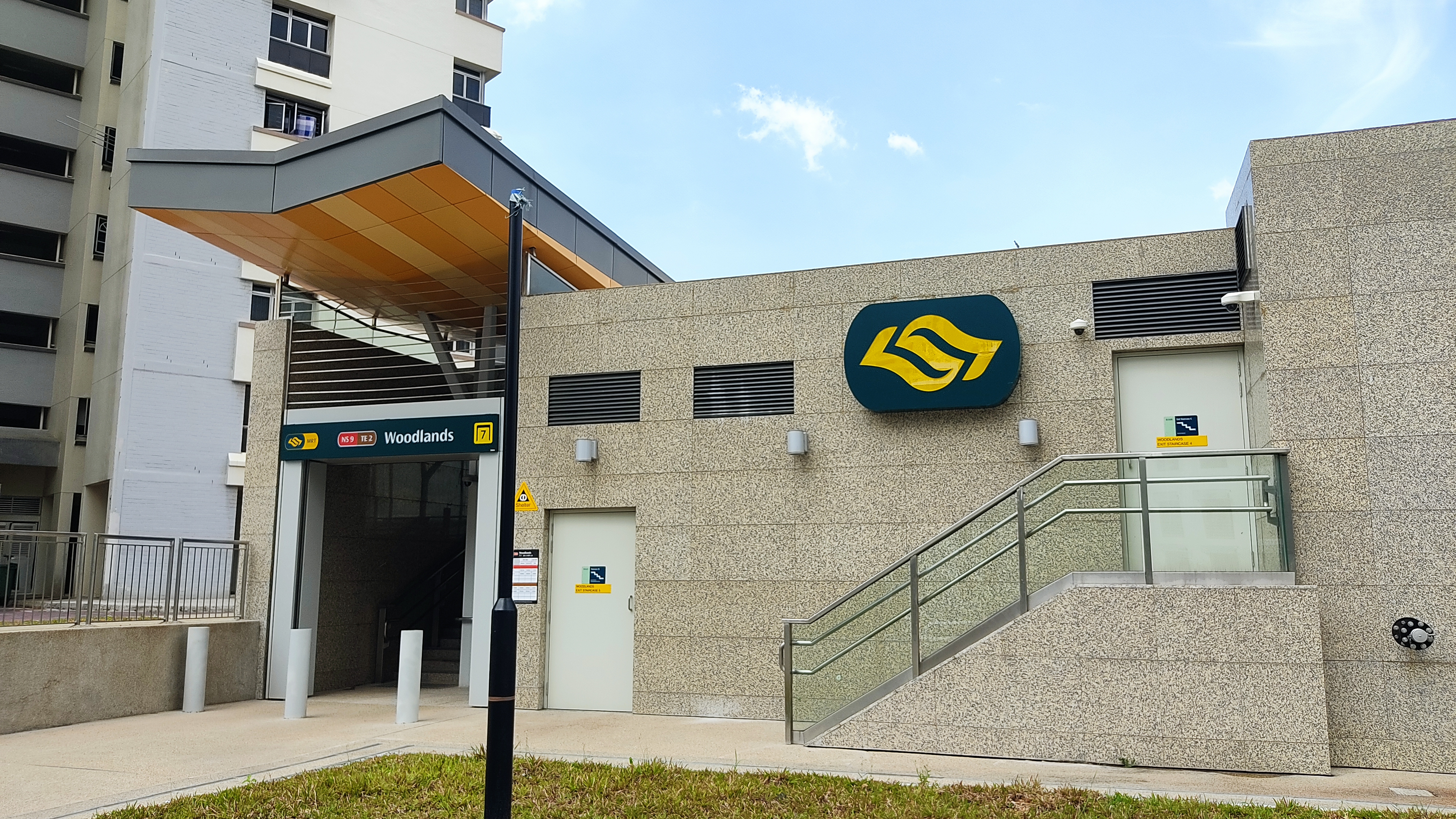
Woodlands MRT station, outside where 19-year-old Dini Haryati was found murdered at a nearby forest

On 4 January 1998, 19-year-old Dini Haryati was last seen leaving her workplace at about 11:00 PM, after she completed her routine night shift. However, she never returned home that night. She also never turned up for work during her morning shift two days after her disappearance. Dini was then reported missing.

On the morning of 6 January 1998, two days after Dini disappeared, a gardener was busy cutting grass in an area nearby Woodlands MRT station when she discovered the semi-naked corpse of a girl, who was only wearing a white shirt and had bruises on her head, neck and abdomen. The discovery was promptly reported to the police, and they arrived at the scene. Based on the identification found on the victim, whose black pants, underwear and shoes were found discarded nearby, the police identified the victim as Dini Haryati. A forensic report confirmed that Dini was raped before being strangled and bludgeoned on the head by a blunt and hard instrument. The cause of Dini's death was a skull fracture caused by blunt force trauma.

Dini's father flew from Indonesia to Singapore to identify his daughter's remains, and was devastated over the death of Dini. At the mortuary, he was accompanied by over 30 friends, colleagues, and representatives of the Indonesian embassy in Singapore. At the time of her death, Dini had one more week before completing her training in Singapore and originally wanted to return to Indonesia to celebrate Hari Raya with her family and invite her Singaporean friends over. A counsellor with the embassy stated that there were many young students from Indonesia and other countries who came to Singapore for hotel industry training courses, and hoped that there could be measures taken to ensure the safety of these students and prevent similar cases from happening.

== Investigations ==
The rape and death of Dini Haryati was classified as murder, and police investigations began to solve the case. Under the laws of Singapore, any offenders found guilty of murder would be sentenced to death by hanging, and the punishment for the rape was up to twenty years in prison, in addition to either a fine or caning, up to 24 strokes.

The police ascertained through their investigations that prior to her death, Dini had boarded a bus from her workplace and later boarded a MRT train to go back home. Dini was speculated to have last walked on a concrete pathway outside the Woodlands MRT station before she was attacked by her rapist, who possibly knocked her unconscious and dragged her to the bushes to sexually assault the girl before killing her. The path was frequently used by lone women who wanted to take a shortcut home, and several of these women told the press that the murder led them to feel uneasy about walking alone at night.

As part of their investigations, the police interviewed over 300 foreign workers living in nearby dormitories, but could not find any suspects, and no murder weapons were recovered. In light of the increasing rate of murder cases, with 13 reported cases between January and February 1998 (including Dini's case and the murder of Iordanka Apostolova), the police assured the public that they would spare no effort to solve these cases and not to lose confidence, as they managed to crack five out of these cases within a short time. Residents living near the area where Dini was murdered were also shocked and fearful for the safety of their female family members, with one concerned resident, who had two teenage daughters, writing to the national newspaper The Straits Times that there should be more lights set up in these secluded areas to ensure no one, including her daughters, would encounter the same fate as Dini.

Three months after Dini was killed, Singaporean crime show Crimewatch re-enacted the murder case and it aired on television in April 1998. The episode covering Dini's killing included a public appeal for information or witnesses to help solve the case, with the assurance that all information would be kept strictly confidential.

However, in spite of the police's efforts to crack the case, the case of Dini Haryati's murder remains unsolved as of today.

== Aftermath ==
Two years after Dini Haryati was raped and killed, another brutal rape-murder occurred at Bukit Batok Nature Park, where 29-year-old financial executive Linda Chua was attacked by a rapist while she was jogging, and brutally raped and beaten by her assailant. Chua died eight days later, on 14 February 2000, while receiving treatment for her injuries. Her attacker was never identified or caught despite extensive police investigations. In light of Chua's murder, Dini's cousin told the press that it was disheartening to hear that another young woman had ended up the same way as Dini, whose killer remained unapprehended.

There were speculations that the murders of both Dini and Chua were the work of the same person, given that both women were alone at the time they were attacked and they were sexually assaulted before their deaths. Three years later, a lone female jogger at MacRitchie Reservoir was also attacked and sexually assaulted, but the assailant fled upon the appearance of other passers-by, and the 23-year-old victim survived her ordeal. Security around the reservoir was tightened. It was theorized that the unidentified rapist that committed the MacRitchie Reservoir rape was the same killer of both Dini and Chua. However, like the two murders, the culprit of this rape was never caught, despite a police sketch of his face.

The Dini Haryati rape-murder case was recalled again in January 2021 when a public appeal was made to re-investigate the unsolved case of Lim Shiow Rong, a seven-year-old schoolgirl who was raped and strangled to death by an unknown killer who was allegedly a friend of her father. The appeal by both Lim's sister and mother was due to the 2007 disappearance case of Felicia Teo, who was classified missing for 13 years before the case was re-classified as murder upon the emergence of new information and a suspect was arrested. The case gave rise to the hope that these high-profile cold cases (which also included the 1985 Winnifred Teo rape-murder case and the 2000 Linda Chua murder case) would be re-investigated and solved in the near future.

== See also ==
- List of unsolved murders (1980–1999)
- Death of Felicia Teo
- Death of Winnifred Teo
- Death of Lim Shiow Rong
- Amber Beacon Tower murder
- Death of Ayakannu Marithamuthu
- Capital punishment in Singapore
- List of major crimes in Singapore
