= Amber Beacon Tower murder =

1990 case of an unsolved murder in Singapore

Kelly Tan Ah Hong
- An undated photo of Kelly Tan Ah Hong before her death
- Born: Tan Ah Hong c. late 1968; Singapore
- Died: 15 May 1990 (aged 21); East Coast Park, Singapore
- Cause of death: Murdered by stabbing
- Other name: Kelly Tan
- Education: Secondary school education (graduated)
- Occupation: Vegetable wholesale employee
- Employer: Tan Lam Lee (father)
- Known for: Murder victim

The Amber Beacon Tower murder is an unsolved case where a woman was murdered by two unknown attackers, who ambushed her and her boyfriend during the couple's romantic night out at Amber Beacon Tower in East Coast Park, Singapore. During the attack, the female victim, 21-year-old Kelly Tan Ah Hong (陈亚凤 Chén Yàfèng), was stabbed in the neck by one of the men while her 22-year-old boyfriend, James Soh Fook Leong (苏福良 Sū Fúliáng), was stabbed in the back by the man's accomplice. Although Soh managed to survive with timely medical intervention, Tan died as a result of massive bleeding from her wound. Despite the extensive police investigations of this case, the murderer(s) were never identified or caught.

== Background ==
Born sometime in late 1968, Kelly Tan Ah Hong was the second of seven children in an affluent family. Although Tan was a Singaporean by birth, her father, Tan Lam Lee, was a Chinese Indonesian immigrant who operated a vegetable wholesale business, while her mother, Ong Lye, was a housewife. Tan had one elder sister, three younger sisters and two younger brothers in her family, who resided at a bungalow house in Thomson Road.

After completing her primary school education, Tan enrolled at Yio Chu Kang Secondary School at Ang Mo Kio, where she became classmates with her future boyfriend, James Soh Fook Leong, who was the only child of his family. His father was the owner of an electronics business. Soh was said to be a studious student and enthusiastic about sports and games. Both he and Tan, who were of the same age, became prefects. Although Tan was the opposite of Soh in terms of their interests and personality, Soh was attracted to Tan, who had mutual feelings for him, and they became friends after they first met.

After both Soh and Tan graduated, Soh enrolled on an electronic engineering course at Ngee Ann Polytechnic, while Tan did not continue studying and instead joined her father's business and worked under him. In 1990, before Soh began his third year at the polytechnic, he decided to ask Tan out, and on 13 May 1990, about a decade after they first met, Soh and Tan officially became a couple. According to Soh's parents, they didn't meet Tan until a few days before her death, when Soh invited her to their flat. Soh's parents remembered their son telling them that Tan was his former schoolmate, but they never knew the specific nature of the couple's relationship.

== Murder of Kelly Tan ==
James Soh Fook Leong, the sole survivor of the case and Kelly Tan's boyfriend.

On the night of 15 May 1990, two days after they first became a couple, James Soh and Kelly Tan went to have a date at East Coast Park. They headed to the Amber Beacon Tower, which was a popular spot for young couples to hang out.

When Soh and Tan were sitting on the tower's spiral staircase and chatting with each other, two men walked past them and went to the upper level of the tower. After about fifteen minutes, the two men ambushed the couple with knives. While Tan ran away to escape one of the attackers, the other man stayed at the tower to attack Soh, who defended himself against the assailant. Soh was stabbed in the back. The wound was so deep that it narrowly missed Soh's spinal cord, and would have been fatal if it had.

A short distance away, Tan was in a more dire situation when her attacker caught up with her. She sustained a deep neck wound on the left side of her neck after her attacker stabbed her below her left ear. The knife wound caused massive bleeding. After the two men escaped the scene, Soh, who had barely retained his consciousness, staggered to help his girlfriend. He tried to bring her to the nearby Singa Inn Seafood Restaurant; one of their attackers was last seen running towards the restaurant, while the other was last seen running to the park's bird sanctuary.

Soh, who was drenched in blood, managed to reach the restaurant, and asked the employees to help his girlfriend and himself, before he fainted. The police and ambulance, as well as Soh's parents (who rushed to the scene), were contacted, and 22-year-old James Soh Fook Leong was rushed to Singapore General Hospital, where he survived with timely medical intervention. 21-year-old Kelly Tan Ah Hong was pronounced dead at the scene. Reportedly, Soh, who regained consciousness in hospital and was in stable condition, was unaware of his girlfriend's death and kept asking his mother if she was all right. Soh was said to be devastated upon receiving news of Tan's death two days after she was killed. Soh's parents had kept the news from their son for fear it may affect his recovery progress, in accordance with the doctor's opinion. According to Soh's 47-year-old mother, whose surname was Tan, she and her husband were baffled over the horrific and senseless attack, and she knew that her son did not have any enemies since he was often well-behaved.

Tan's father, who was in Indonesia at the time, flew back to Singapore to attend his daughter's funeral.

== Investigations ==
The case of Kelly Tan Ah Hong's death was classified as murder. Under the laws of Singapore, the death penalty was the mandated sentence for any offenders found guilty of murder. In light of the violent killing of Tan, which shocked the nation, members of the public, especially young people and couples, were advised by the authorities to be vigilant when going out at night.

As part of their investigations, the police interviewed the survivor, James Soh, in the hospital. Soh was unable to recall the faces of their attackers, and could not hear their voices, since the two men never spoke a word during the attack. However, the police were able to gain a description that the men were dark-looking and that the person who attacked Soh had short hair and was about 173 cm tall. The second assailant, who went after Tan, was about 167 cm and had curly black hair. The assailants were speculated to be drug addicts. They were also speculated to be foreigners, as Soh remembered hearing the two killers speaking a foreign language while they were escaping from the tower. Although both Tan and Soh did not lose anything, robbery was theorized as a possible motive; this theory was corroborated by previous reports of people being robbed in East Coast Park during nights or late evenings. The police also did not rule out the possibility of a revenge killing, but both Soh and Tan were known to be good-mannered people who did not have any grudges or feuds with other people. Due to the lack of clues, the police were unable to make a breakthrough in their investigations. The murder weapons were never recovered.

In April 1992, two years after the incident, a coroner's court held an inquiry of Kelly Tan's death and issued a verdict of murder by a person or persons unknown. Professor Chao Tzee Cheng, the senior forensic pathologist, certified that the knife wound to Tan's neck had cut through an artery, which resulted in excessive blood loss, which caused her death. James Soh, who by then had begun to serve his National Service after completing his diploma, came to court to testify during the coroner's inquiry. After the coroner's verdict was meted out, Tan's bereaved family put up a reward of S$30,000 for any information leading to the arrest of Tan's murderer(s). According to Tan's 28-year-old cousin, Anthony Tan, who was also the manager of her father's company, the reward would be entrusted to the police and be indefinitely in effect until the arrest of Tan's killer(s).

In June 1992, the Singaporean crime show Crimewatch re-enacted the Amber Beacon Tower murder. During the episode, both the police and Tan's family, including Tan's 42-year-old mother, Ong Lye, and 26-year-old older sister, Tan Kwee Mui, appealed for information from members of the public to assist in their investigations. Tan's mother and sisters were reportedly still haunted by nightmares and sadness about the murder, due to the uncertainty of when the case would be solved. Flyers were also published on newspapers to seek the public's help to solve the murder.

Despite the police's efforts to investigate Tan's murder, the Amber Beacon Tower murder case remains unsolved, and the police were unable to uncover the identities of the killer(s). The police investigations remain open in this case, as all criminal cases in Singapore, including murder, do not carry a statute of limitations. The police would regularly review these outstanding cases from time to time to yield any new clues to solve these cases.

== Aftermath ==
Amber Beacon Tower, where Kelly Tan was attacked and killed back in 1990.

The murder of Kelly Tan Ah Hong remains one of Singapore's infamous cases of unsolved murders, which also included the 1979 Geylang Bahru family murders, the 1985 Winnifred Teo murder case, the 1984 curry murder and several others.

After surviving the attack, Tan's former boyfriend, James Soh Fook Leong, would eventually work in sales after completing his education. He was later married to another woman and they had a son, who was 16 years old when his father was interviewed in 2015.

In July 2015, 25 years after his former girlfriend's murder, James Soh, then 47 years old, was approached for an interview, and he agreed to talk about his ordeal. Soh, who remained haunted and traumatized from the attack, stated that even after many years, he was unable to understand why he and Tan were attacked, and he still could not recall the faces of their assailants. He also developed a fear of footsteps coming from behind him and avoided secluded places at all times. Soh stated that he regretted not knowing Tan better before she died, and he still tried to move on from the incident, something which he finally told his son in 2014. Soh added that due to the attack, he often reminds his son not to go to secluded places and to be vigilant at all times. Soh also held on to the hope that the killer(s) of Tan would be brought to justice and asked that anyone with information about the killing to step forward to help crack the case.

The Amber Beacon Tower, where Kelly Tan was murdered, was rumoured to be haunted since her death, and there were reported sightings of a ghostly figure, described as the restless soul of Tan, roaming around the area at night, due to her unjust death and her murderer(s) not being arrested or punished. Wailing sounds and some fresh bloodstains at the tower were also included among the witness accounts regarding the tower's haunted presence. Lee Teng, a Taiwanese television host based in Singapore, revealed that when he and his friends camped near the tower in East Coast Park back in secondary school, his Buddha pendant mysteriously disappeared the next morning. Lee also claimed that, in one of the photographs taken by his friend at the tower that night, a shadowy figure was seen "hovering near another friend's head."

== See also ==
- List of unsolved murders (1980–1999)
- Death of Felicia Teo
- Death of Winnifred Teo
- Death of Lim Shiow Rong
- Death of Ayakannu Marithamuthu
- Capital punishment in Singapore
- List of major crimes in Singapore
