= Sheung =

Sheung may refer to:

- Sheung (surname), a Cantonese spelling of various Chinese surnames
- Sheung Tsuen, a village in Yuen Long, Hong Kong

== See also ==
- Sheung (上 'above, upper') is found in the names of many places in Hong Kong, most notably:
  - Sheung Wan, Hong Kong Island
  - Sheung Shui, New Territories
