= Fa-ch'ang =

Fa-ch'ang (法常 fǎ-cháng) may be:

- Fa-ch'ang 法常, 4th-century Buddhist scholar.
- Fa-ch'ang 法常, 7th-century Buddhist scholar.
- Ta-mei Fa-ch'ang (Damei Fachang, Daibai Hōjō ) 大梅法常 (752-839), Buddhist scholar
- Li Gonglin 李公麟, also known as Fa-ch'ang 法常, 11th-century Chinese painter.
