= Teo (given name) =

Teo is a masculine given name or a nickname for Theodore, Teodor, Teofilo, Mateo, Teoman etc. It may refer to:

- Teo González (born 1964), Spanish post-minimalist painter
- Teo Kardum (born 1986), Croatian footballer
- Teo Macero (1925–2008), American jazz musician, composer and record producer born Attilio Joseph Macero

== Nickname ==
- Teófilo Gutiérrez (born 1985), Colombian footballer better known as "Teo"
- Theodoros Papaloukas (born 1977), Greek basketball player nicknamed "Teo"
- Miloš Teodosić (born 1987), Serbian basketball player nicknamed "Teo"
- Teoscar Hernandez (born 1992), Dominican baseball player nicknamed "Teo"

== See also ==
- Theo, a given name
- Teoman, a Turkish name
- Teoh
- Teo (disambiguation)
- Teo (surname)
