= Zhang (surname) =

Chinese surname

Zhang / Chang
- Zhang surname in regular script
- Pronunciation: IPA: /tʂɑŋ˥/ (Mandarin IPA); Zhāng (Mandarin Pinyin); Zoeng1 (Cantonese Jyutping); Tiuⁿ (Hokkien Pe̍h-ōe-jī)
- Language: Chinese, Korean, Vietnamese

Origin
- Language: Old Chinese
- Derivation: Nie
- Meaning: drawing a bow, archer, bowyer, a classifier for flat objects

Zhang ([ʈʂáŋ]; traditional Chinese: 張; simplified Chinese: 张) is the third most common surname in China and Taiwan (commonly spelled as Chang in Taiwan), and it is one of the most common surnames in the world. It is spoken in the first tone Zhāng. In the Wade–Giles system of romanization, it is romanized as Chang, which is commonly used in Taiwan. Cheung is commonly used in Hong Kong as a romanization. It is the 24th name on the Hundred Family Surnames poem, contained in the verse 何呂施張 (Hé Lǚ Shī Zhāng).

Zhang is also the pinyin romanization of the less-common surnames 章 (Zhāng), which is the 40th name on the Hundred Family Surnames poem, and 仉 (Zhǎng).

Today, it is one of the most common surnames in the world at over 100 million people worldwide. Zhang was listed by the People's Republic of China's National Citizen ID Information System as the third-most-common surname in mainland China (April 2007), with 87.50 million bearers.

A commonly cited but erroneous factoid in the 1990 Guinness Book of Records listed it as the world's most common surname, but no comprehensive information from China was available at the time and more recent editions have not repeated the claim.

== Transliterations and derivatives ==
Transliteration	Regions
Zhang/Chang	China, Taiwan, Korea
Cheung/Zoeng	Hong Kong, Macau
Cheong	Macau, Malaysia, Hakka, Gan
Chong	Hakka
Diong	Eastern Min
Tiong	Eastern Min, Philippines
Tsan/Tsaon	Wu (Shanghainese)
Teoh, Teo	Hokkien, Teochew
Tew	Teochew
Tjang/Tjiong/Tjon/Tjong	Indonesia
Trương/Trang	Vietnam
Jang/Chang (장)	Korea

Zhang in Mandarin, alternatively romanized as Chang in Taiwan and among the Chinese diaspora using older romanization systems. However, Zhang has been the official first-recommended translation for 張 in Taiwan since 2017.

=== Derivatives ===
- As the Hanja of the Korean surname romanized as Jang or Chang (Korean: 장; Hanja: 張)
- As the Kanji for the Japanese surname romanized as Chō
- As the Hán Tự for the Vietnamese surname Trương or Trang
- Derived as Canggih, Candra, Hidayat, Irawan, Jaya, Prasetya, Sutiono, or other Indonesianized surnames among Chinese Indonesians

== Distribution ==
Zhang is the third-most-common surname mainland China, making up 6.83% of the population of the People's Republic of China. In 2019 it was the most common surname in exactly one provincial-level division, Shanghai municipality. In Taiwan, 張 is the fourth-most-common surname, making up 5.26% of the population of the Republic of China. In 2019 it was again the third most common surname in Mainland China.

Zhang Wei (张伟) has been the most common family name and given name combination in China for many years.

Among the Chinese diaspora, the name remains common but takes on various romanizations. "Teo" and "Chong" are amongst the most common surnames among Chinese Singaporeans, listed at 11th and 19th respectively; "Chang" is the 6th-most-common surname among Chinese Americans; and "Zhang" was the 7th-most-common particularly Chinese surname found in a 2010 survey of Ontario's Registered Persons Database of Canadian health card recipients.

== History ==
=== Characters ===
張 combines the Chinese characters 弓 (gōng, "bow") and 長 (simp. 长, cháng, "long" or "wide"). It originally meant "to open up" or "to spread" as an arching bow, but as a common noun in modern use it is a measure word for flat objects such as paper and cloth, like the English "sheet of".

=== Families ===
The traditional origin of the surname 張 (Old Chinese: *C. traŋ) is rooted in Chinese legend. The fifth son of the Yellow Emperor, Qing Yangshi (simplified Chinese: 青阳氏; traditional Chinese: 青陽氏; pinyin: Qīng Yángshì), had a son Hui (挥; 揮; Huī) who was inspired by the Heavenly Bow constellation (天弓星, Tiān Gōng Xīng) to invent the bow and arrow. Hui was then promoted to "First Bow" (弓正, Gōng Zhèng) and bestowed the surname 張, which – when broken into its constituent radicals – means "widening bow" or "archer". Its Middle Chinese pronunciation has been reconstructed as Trjang.

=== Other origins ===
- for some families, it is traced back to Xie Zhang (解張), whose style name was Zhang Hou (張侯, lit “Marquis Zhang”) a noble in Jin during the Spring and Autumn period.
- from the family of Zhang Liao (張遼), an official in Cao Wei during Three Kingdoms period. Zhāng Liao's family had changed from Nie to Zhang to avoid association with his disgraced ancestor Nie Yi (聶壹).
- the surname is also traced back to Long Youna, chief of a minority ethnic groups during the Three Kingdoms period, who was given the Chinese surname Zhang (張) by Zhuge Liang, the prime minister of Shu.

== Notable people with the surname Zhang ==
- Angela Chang (born 1982), Taiwanese singer and actress.
- Carl Chang, multiple people
- Chang Cheh, Hong Kong film director
- Chang Chen-yue or "A-Yue", Taiwanese rock musician.
- Chang Ching-sen (born 1959), Governor of Fujian Province, Republic of China
- Chang Fei or "Fei Ge", Taiwanese television personality.
- Chang Huasen (born 1997), Chinese actor and singer
- Chang Hui-mei or "A-mei", aboriginal Taiwanese singer and songwriter
- Chang Jin-fu (born 1948), Governor of Taiwan (Republic of China province) (2009–2010)
- Chang Kai-chen (born 1991), Taiwanese tennis player
- Chang King Hai Chinese international footballer in 1948 Olympics
- Chang King-yuh (born 1937), Minister of Mainland Affairs Council of the Republic of China (1996–1999)
- Chang Liang-jen (born 1946), Deputy Minister of National Defense of the Republic of China (2008–2009)
- Chang Li-shan (born 1964), Magistrate-elect of Yunlin County
- Chang San-cheng (born 1954), Premier of the Republic of China (2016)
- Chang Tzi-chin, Deputy Magistrate of Taipei County (2005–2006)
- Chang Yu-sheng (1966–1997), Taiwanese singer, composer, and producer
- Chen Chung Chang (1927–2014), mathematician
- Deserts Chang, Taiwanese singer/songwriter.
- Feiping Chang, Taiwanese-born Hong Kong socialite and fashion blogger
- Edmond E-min Chang (born 1970), Taiwanese American federal district judge for northern Illinois
- Eileen Chang (1920–1995), Chinese writer
- Erchen Chang, Taiwanese chef
- Eva Fong Chang (1897–1991), American artist
- Franklin Chang-Díaz (born 1950) a former NASA astronaut from Costa Rica.
- Iris Chang (1968–2004), American historian and journalist
- Jeff Chang, Taiwanese singer
- Jung Chang, Chinese writer and author of Wild Swans
- Katharine Chang, Chairperson of Straits Exchange Foundation
- Kathleen Chang, born Kathy Change, political activist who died by self-immolation in 1996
- Li Fung Chang, Taiwanese communications engineer
- Marcus Chang, Taiwanese actor and singer-songwriter
- Michael Te-Pei Chang (born 1972), Chinese-American tennis player
- Peng Chun Chang (1892–1957), Chinese professor, philosopher, and playwright who helped draft the Universal Declaration of Human Rights
- Phil Chang, Taiwanese singer-songwriter and television personality
- Sarah Chang (born 1985), Taiwanese-American actress
- Shi-Kuo Chang, Taiwanese computer scientist and science fiction author
- Sidney H. Chang (1934–2016), American historian
- Stanley Chang (born 1982), Democratic member of the Hawaii State Senate
- Steve Chang (born 1954), Taiwanese businessman
- Tseng Chang (1930–2021), Chinese American actor
- Victor Chang (1936–1991), Chinese Australian cardiac surgeon
- Lay Zhang (born 1991), Chinese singer and actor
- Weili Zhang (born 1990), Chinese professional mixed-martial artist, and first Chinese fighter to win a UFC championship
- Zhilei Zhang (born 1983), Chinese boxer

== See also ==
- Chinese name
- Chinese surname
- List of common Chinese surnames
- Trương, Zhang in Vietnamese
