= Zhang (surname 章) =

Chinese family name

Zhāng is a Chinese surname. According to a 2013 study it was the 122-most common surname, shared by 1,570,000 people or 0.120% of the population, with the province with the most people being Zhejiang. It is the 40th name on the Hundred Family Surnames poem.

The surname written 章 in Chữ Nôm is clearly distinguished and written as Trang or Chương. 章 was unlisted among the top 100 in either location. In 2015 it was reported 88th.

章 combines the characters 音 (yin, "sound", "(musical) note") and 十 (shi, "ten"). It originally meant "brilliant", "to display", "a distinctive mark" and was used as the name of a fief, but as a common noun in modern use it means an "article" in a newspaper or magazine or a "chapter" in a book or law.

The surname 章 (Old Chinese: *taŋ) originated from the legendary Yan Emperor, whose personal surname was Jiang (姜). On the establishment of the state of Qi, Jiang Ziya apportioned the land among his many descendants, including a one known as Zhang (鄣国). Some of the people of this state simplified the character and took 章 as their surname, particularly after it was annexed by Qi. The Middle Chinese pronunciation of the name was Tsyang, the beginnings of what we now know to be the "Zhang" surname.

It means "stamp, seal" in Chinese.

- Gordon G. Chang (章家敦, born 1951), American writer and attorney who wrote The Coming Collapse of China (2001)
- Cheang Hong Lim (章芳林, 1825-1893), Singaporean philanthropist
- Teresa Cheung Siu-wai (章小蕙, born 1963), Canadian actress
- Zhang Binglin (章炳麟, 1868–1936), Chinese philologist, textual critic, and anti-Manchu revolutionary.
- Zhang Hanzhi (章含之, 1935–2008) Chinese diplomat who was Mao Zedong's English teacher and U.S. President Richard Nixon's interpreter during his historic 1972 trip to China.
- Yingying Zhang (章莹颖, 1990–2017), Chinese student who was murdered while studying in the US at the University of Illinois at Urbana–Champaign
- Zhang Zetian (章泽天, born 1993), also known as Nancy Zhang, a Chinese businesswoman and investor who is the chief fashion adviser of the luxury business of JD.com
- Zhang Zhong (章钟, born 1978), Chinese chess grandmaster who now plays for Singapore.
- Zhang Ziyi (章子怡, born 1979), Chinese actress and model
- Zhang Hao (章昊, born 2000), Chinese singer active in South Korea.
- Zhang Xichen (章锡琛, 1889–1969), Chinese editor and publisher
- Zhang Xuelei (1963–2024), Chinese basketball player.
