= Philip Porter =

Philip Porter may refer to:

- Philip S. Porter (1925–2011), American martial artist
- Philip Thomas Porter (1930–2011), electrical engineer
