= McDonald's boys case =

1986 unsolved case of missing boys in Singapore

Keh Chin Ann
- Keh Chin Ann
- Born: Keh Chin Ann; 22 March 1974; Singapore
- Disappeared: 14 May 1986 (aged 12); Owen Road, Singapore
- Status: Missing for 40 years, 5 months and 26 days
- Parents: Keh Cheng Pan (father); Tay Mee Na (mother)
- Relatives: Keh Hui Hong (elder sister); Another elder sister (unnamed)

Toh Hong Huat
- Toh Hong Huat
- Born: Toh Hong Huat; 18 May 1974 or 5 June 1974 (Note: On a fake birth certificate illegally made in Malaysia, Hong Huat's birth date was revealed as 5 June 1974.); Malaysia
- Disappeared: 14 May 1986 (aged 11); Owen Road, Singapore
- Status: Missing for 40 years, 5 months and 26 days
- Parent(s): Tan Geok Kuan (mother; alleged adoptive mother); Toh Hoo Don (father)
- Relatives: "Samsu" (alleged natural mother)

On the afternoon of 14 May 1986, in Owen Road, Singapore, two primary school boys, 12-year-old Keh Chin Ann (born 22 March 1974; Chinese: 郭振安; Pe̍h-ōe-jī: Keh Chín-an; pinyin: Guō Zhènān) and his same-age best friend Toh Hong Huat (born 18 May 1974 or 5 June 1974; Chinese: 卓鸿发; Pe̍h-ōe-jī: Tō͘ Hông-hoat; pinyin: Zhuó Hóngfā), who were classmates from the same school, were last known to be walking together to school after Chin Ann fetched Hong Huat from his house nearby. The boys were never seen again, and were reported missing on that afternoon. Since then, investigations and search efforts have been made to locate the boys' whereabouts. The case was named The McDonald's Boys due to the Singaporean branch of the fast-food chain McDonald's offering a $100,000 reward for any information related to the boys' whereabouts.

Countless theories evolved around the reason behind the boys' disappearance, which included possible kidnapping, murder, and or the boys running away from home. However, no theories were proven due to a lack of concrete evidence. The search efforts expanded from Singapore to other neighbouring countries like Malaysia, Indonesia, and Thailand, but the search failed to yield any tangible information relating to the boys' whereabouts. The boys, who were both declared legally dead, were never found.

== Disappearance of the boys ==
=== Keh Chin Ann ===
On the afternoon of 14 May 1986, 12-year-old Primary Six student Keh Chin Ann, the youngest of three children and only son, got off his school bus and reached his school - Owen Primary School (now defunct since 1989 and demolished) - where he was enrolled in the afternoon class shift. One of Chin Ann's classmates, Wang Piwei (Chinese: 王碧伟; pinyin: Wáng Bìweǐ; Pe̍h-ōe-jī: Ông Phek-úi), was the last person to see Chin Ann, as he approached Chin Ann, offering to help him take care of his school bag as Chin Ann wanted to go to the nearby shops outside their school to buy something. Piwei then left Chin Ann's bag at the school's tuckshop bench, assuming that Chin Ann would come back to collect it. However, he never saw his classmate again after Chin Ann left the school.

=== Toh Hong Huat ===
Chin Ann's 12-year-old best friend and Malaysian-born classmate Toh Hong Huat, who lived with his Malaysian mother, Tan Geok Kuan (Chinese: 陈玉娟; Pe̍h-ōe-jī: Tân Gio̍k-koan; pinyin: Chén Yùjuān), at a house located 500 meters away from his school, was last seen by his mother at his house. According to Tan, Hong Huat, who was her first and only child, went outside the house and told her he was walking to school with his friend Chin Ann, who came to fetch him. That was the last time Tan saw her son. Tan said that it was unlike Hong Huat to not let her accompany him to school, as he was usually more timid and liked his mother's company in public.

The boys failed to show up for class at 12:55 PM (SGT) and they were never seen again after 12:30 PM on 14 May 1986.

== Investigation and search efforts ==
=== Police report and investigations ===
The form teacher noticed the absence of the two boys Toh Hong Huat and Keh Chin Ann, and informed the boys' parents. By evening, after receiving the call from the school teachers, Hong Huat's 46-year-old mother Tan Geok and Chin Ann's parents - 51-year-old coffee powder seller Keh Cheng Pan (also named Keh Chin Poh; Chinese: 郭清保; Pe̍h-ōe-jī: Keh Chheng-pó; pinyin: Guō Qīngbǎo) and 46-year-old housewife Tay Mee Na (Chinese: 郑美娜; Pe̍h-ōe-jī: Tēⁿ Bí-ná; pinyin: Zhèng Meǐnà) - showed up in school out of concern. Wang Piwei, Chin Ann's classmate who last seen him, earlier informed the teachers about Chin Ann's absence. Even though it occurred to the teachers that Hong Huat and Chin Ann may have played truant, however, it was unlikely so because the boys were generally well-behaved and did not miss classes; Hong Huat even ranked the first in his class for the mathematics test. By 7:15 pm, the boys' parents failed to find their sons.

The police were later contacted and they searched the estates surrounding the boys' school for days following their disappearances, but they could not find any helpful information. The police also published and distributed thousands of missing posters of Hong Huat and Chin Ann, which were distributed island-wide in Singapore to urge anyone who had information on the whereabouts of the missing boys to contact the police, and the public media also publicized the case extensively. By May 1988, two years after the boys' disappearance, over 100 people were interviewed by the police to obtain a lead.

On 27 August 1986, an anonymous informant reported to the police that he saw the missing boys on Pulau Ubin. The Criminal Investigation Department (CID) dispatched nearly 100 officers to Pulau Ubin, splitting the officers into 24 sections and smaller teams to search for the boys throughout the whole island. However, the police were unable to find the boys; the boys' families also joined the search but also found nothing.

A few months after the incident, Hong Huat's mother returned to Kuala Lumpur, Malaysia to search for her son. In 1990, Tan reached out to a local newspaper and also the Malaysian Chinese Association for help, and the Malaysian authorities also responded to Tan's appeal to search for the boys. In 1987, the Singapore Police Force expanded their search to Malaysia and a few other neighbouring countries like Indonesia and Thailand. The missing boys’ reports have also been sent to Interpol. However, the international search still failed to locate the whereabouts of Hong Huat and Chin Ann.

In November 1988, two years and six months after Chin Ann and Hong Huat went missing, Singapore's national newspaper, The Straits Times, sent a request for help from an American company to create a photo of what Chin Ann might look like as a 14-year-old using facial recognition technology. The request was granted and the photo of Chin Ann, which was published in November 1988, was created based on a photo of Chin Ann at 12-years-old and a photo of one of his elder sisters, Hui Hong, at 14-years-old.

In 1994, during the eighth year of the boys' disappearance, the police released photos of Chin Ann and Hong Huat as 20-year-olds, created with the help of facial recognition technology and computer technology.

=== Rewards ===
Despite their poverty, the families of Toh Hong Huat and Keh Chin Ann initially offered a S$1,000 reward each to anyone who could provide information about their sons' whereabouts. Both families increased the reward to S$5,000 in July 1986, which later increased to S$20,000 two months later. The families stated that they had no other options but to raise the reward due to their increasing desperation to get any information about their sons' whereabouts.

In October 1986, Managing Director Robert Kwan, who led the Singaporean branch of the fast food chain McDonald's, announced that the company would be offering a S$100,000 reward for any new information on the whereabouts of the missing boys. They also put up missing posters of the boys and publicised the reward at every outlet of McDonald's across Singapore.

== Theories behind the boys' disappearance ==
There were several theories that were circulated regarding the boys' disappearance.

One of the first theories was that the two 12-year-old boys - Toh Hong Huat and Keh Chin Ann - may have run away from home. The boys' parents refuted this theory, as their boys were well-behaved and would not have run away. The parents doted on their sons, and always gave the boys what they wanted. The boys' allowances and savings were left untouched, and they only had a little cash in their possession, so it was not considered possible that the boys ran away from home.

Another theory was that the boys were abducted by foreign crime syndicates and sent to other countries, where they were forced to act as beggars after getting their limbs and tongues chopped off. However, there were no reports of children going missing before or after the disappearances of Chin Ann and Hong Huat, and there were no immigration records of children leaving the country around the time the boys disappeared. In 1994, it was reported that there were alleged sightings of the boys begging on the streets of Thailand, but there was no concrete evidence to support these sightings. The boys' parents went to Thailand to search for their sons, but they failed to locate them.

The next theory was that the boys could have been kidnapped for either ransom or revenge, but the boys' parents did not receive any phone calls demanding ransom. The families were extremely poor and not well-off: Chin Ann's father, Keh Cheng Pan, was the sole breadwinner of the family and his salary was barely enough to feed the family, while Hong Huat's mother, Tan Geok Kuan, did not earn much from her job. The parents also did not have any conflicts with people around them; Chin Ann's father was known to be a gentle and well-mannered person who mixed well with others, while Hong Huat's mother did not have any problems with people from her social circle despite being a divorced single parent and having an unhappy marriage. It was also unlikely that someone would kidnap the boys out of revenge against the parents over unsettled scores.

Among the remaining unproven theories, some suggested that the boys were murdered, with each theory suggesting a different motive or reason. One of these murder-related theories suggested that the boys were victims of a ritual killing. In September 1986, Chin Ann's father was hospitalized. Prior to the hospitalization, Keh had received a phone call from an unknown person who told him not to look for his son as the caller said he had killed both Chin Ann and Hong Huat as sacrifice for a religious ritual. Keh later recovered despite having a stroke and slight limp, and had no memory of the phone call. Hong Huat's mother also received a similar phone call, which warned her not to hope for her son's return. Still, there was little evidence to show that the boys may have been killed. The other murder theories were also debunked, as there were no bodies found and no probable motive for murder.

== Development of case in later years ==
=== Renewed attention of similar case ===
The 1994 reports of the possible whereabouts of Keh Chin Ann and Toh Hong Huat brought renewed attention to a similar case of a 12-year-old boy who went missing in Singapore back in 1975.

On 14 November 1975, 12-year-old Wong Weng Boon (born 1963 Chinese: 黄荣文; Pe̍h-ōe-jī: N̂g Êng-bûn; pinyin: Huáng Róngwén) was last seen by his schoolmates leaving school, with only a soccer ball and a $1 coin in his pocket. His disappearance was first reported three weeks after he went missing, but there was no significant public attention paid to the case and few developments despite police investigations. According to news reports and a documentary, Weng Boon, also called Johnny, was the third child out of four, and he has two older brothers, Wong Weng Soon (born 1957) and Watson Wong (born 1959), and a sister, Audrey Wong (born 1967). His father, Wong Kim Yew, died at age 73 in 2001.

Soon after the 12-year-old boy was reported missing, a friend of Weng Boon's eldest brother, Weng Soon, claimed he witnessed a boy resembling Weng Boon at a back alley in Bugis several days after he was reported missing. He alleged there were two violent-looking male strangers standing at the boy's side, aggressively driving the friend away. All three of them were gone by the time Weng Boon's family was alerted and led to the alley by the friend.

Nineteen years later, in 1994, Weng Boon's second-eldest brother, Watson, made a public appeal for information to help locate his brother, after he read news reports of the missing boys Chin Ann and Hong Huat. There were several similarities between the circumstances of the disappearances, including the area where they were last seen and the school they attended for elementary school education. Weng Boon's mother, Chan Yoke Lin (aged 73 in 2001), also expressed her hope that her son could be found and returned to his family, and had even gone to Thailand to search for her son. Despite the renewed attention to his disappearance, Weng Boon still remains missing.

=== 1996 private investigation claims ===
In 1996, ten years after the boys went missing, private investigator Henry Tay, a former police officer, revealed his own investigation behind the disappearance of Keh Chin Ann and Toh Hong Huat. Based on his investigation, he speculated that it was highly likely the boys went missing due to Hong Huat's father, Toh Hoo Don.

It was revealed that Toh, a former gang member, and his wife, Tan Geok Kuan, a former bar hostess, were formerly co-owners of a bus company before financial difficulties led to Toh selling off the buses. The couple argued frequently and they eventually divorced. Tan got custody of their son and only child, Hong Huat. The legal issues ended with Toh having to pay a huge sum to his ex-wife for selling the buses. Toh, who loved and doted on his son, was filled with hatred for Tan, who had banned him from regularly visiting Hong Huat, so he would regularly come to Hong Huat's former school (West Hill Primary School) to visit him. Tan, who received word of Toh's visits from the teacher, became fearful that her husband would steal Hong Huat away from her, so she had transferred Hong Huat to different schools three times, and moved away from her old address in Sembawang. She also accompanied Hong Huat to school daily even though Hong Huat was approaching the age of twelve; the former school principal, Goh Tong Seng, confirmed this information in a documentary interview.

From this, the private investigator, Henry Tay, theorized that Toh might have met Hong Huat on the day he went missing, and taken him away. Chin Ann was said to have tagged along with Hong Huat and his father.

Tay also revealed that Tan was not Hong Huat's biological mother. Hong Huat was the illegitimate son of Toh and Toh's former girlfriend from an affair. Since the girlfriend, known as "Samsu", did not want the child, Tan adopted Hong Huat, and illegally made a fake birth certificate to claim she was Hong Huat's natural mother. "Samsu" was said to be approached by Toh, who allegedly told her he wanted to take Hong Huat back and raise him.

Following Tay's investigation and revelation, Tan denied that she was not Hong Huat's birth mother, and insisted that Hong Huat was her biological child. Toh was also arrested as a suspect behind the disappearance of his son and Chin Ann. After 24 hours of interrogation, Toh was released due to lack of evidence to put forward a charge against him.

=== 2010 tip-off ===
In 2010, the case once again gained attention due to a tip-off. The unidentified informant claimed that he saw the two boys playing with a girl in a garden behind a hospital, before they encountered a man forcibly taking Toh Hong Huat away. Keh Chin Ann allegedly followed the man and asked who he was, with the man replying he was Hong Huat's father. It was rumoured that the boys were taken to Johor in Malaysia, and they lived in a rural village, where they allegedly went astray and became gangsters in adulthood. These claims were not proven due to lack of evidence.

== Aftermath ==
The McDonald's boys case grew to become one of Singapore's most mysterious and bizarre missing person cases, together with a few more cases like the 2007 Felicia Teo Wei Ling case (re-classified and confirmed as a murder case in 2020), the 1978 missing social escorts case, and the 1984 missing caretaker case.

As of 2026, Toh Hong Huat and Keh Chin Ann remain missing.

=== Fate of the boys' families ===
Throughout the years after the disappearance, the families of Chin Ann and Hong Huat continued to hope that the boys were still alive and would return, despite their sadness over the boys' disappearance. Both families had gotten closer to each other due to their common goal to look for their children. In 1993, seven years after the boys' disappearance, both Hong Huat and Chin Ann were automatically declared dead by the authorities; under Singapore law, a person should be assumed dead once they were confirmed to be missing for at least seven years. Still, the families refused to give up hope that the boys would return.

Hong Huat's mother, Tan Geok Kuan, who returned to Malaysia to live, continued to contact the Malaysian authorities for any updates about her son's case. In 1990, Datuk Seri Michael Chong (aged 72 in 2020), who led the Malaysian Chinese Association's (MCA) Public Services and Complaints Department, received a visit from Tan, who asked for his help to find her son. Chong, who recounted the case in a 2020 interview, recalled that Tan seemed calm and looked resigned to fate, seeming to be prepared for the worst about her son's disappearance. After a few phone calls, she never called again. Tan's fate and current status are unknown.

Chin Ann's family moved out of their old home in Toa Payoh three years after Chin Ann disappeared, and settled somewhere in a central part of Singapore. For the next few years, the family would still regularly go back to their old address in case Chin Ann returned, and awaited more news of Chin Ann's case. Chin Ann's parents and two elder sisters were depressed over Chin Ann's disappearance. Chin Ann's father, Keh Cheng Pan, suffered from poor health allegedly due to his son's disappearance; he had a stroke and also dementia during his elderly years.

According to Chin Ann's mother, Tay Mee Na (aged 80 in 2020), during an interview in 2020, her husband, Keh Cheng Pan, died a few years before 2020. For many years, Tay, who was still alive as of 2020, did not mingle with her neighbours, who all sympathized with her and tried to open up to her. She also spent her time looking at children playing at the void deck, and never smiled for more than ten or twenty years. According to her neighbours, Tay, who still missed her son, slowly began to open up and smile to her neighbours more recently before the 2020 interview.

=== In popular media ===
In November 1986, Singaporean crime show Crimewatch re-enacted the case of the missing McDonald's boys, and the episode also contained a public appeal for any information about the whereabouts of the boys.

In 2004, 18 years after the disappearance of Toh Hong Huat and Keh Chin Ann, Singaporean documentary series Missing re-enacted the case of the missing boys. In the show's first episode, Chin Ann's then 70-year-old father, Keh Cheng Pan, was interviewed by the show's production team and spoke about his depression over the uncertain fate of his missing son; he still kept the photos of Chin Ann and Hong Huat in his wallet even after 18 years since the boys' disappearance. Loh Gek Siang, a family friend of Keh's parents, also spoke in the show about the distress Chin Ann's parents felt about the disappearance of their son. The show's production team tried to contact Hong Huat's mother, Tan Geok Kuan, for an on-screen interview, but they could not trace her whereabouts or contact information.

== See also ==
- Death of Felicia Teo
- Death of Ayakannu Marithamuthu
- List of major crimes in Singapore
- List of people who disappeared
