= Cheng Gin Yi =

Taiwanese singer and composer

- 鄭進一
- Born: Cheng Gun-yi; 23 June 1955 (age 70); Xinjing, Tainan, Taiwan
- Occupations: singer, host
- Years active: 1982-present
- Spouse: Chen Zhuli (m. 2006; div. 2007)
- Family: Chang Jinji (brother)
- Musical career
- Genres: Folk, T-pop

Chinese name
- Traditional Chinese: 鄭進一
- Simplified Chinese: 郑进一
Transcriptions
Southern Min
- Hokkien POJ: Tēⁿ Chìn-it

Cheng Gun-yi (birth name)
- Traditional Chinese: 鄭俊義
- Simplified Chinese: 郑俊义
Transcriptions
Southern Min
- Hokkien POJ: Tēⁿ Chùn-gī

Cheng Gin Yi (Chinese: 鄭進一; Pe̍h-ōe-jī: Tēⁿ Chìn-it) is a Taiwanese singer, composer, producer, and show host. He was born in Xinying, Tainan. He was mentored by Chang Fei. Yi is famous for hosting Taiwanese variety shows and singing Taiwanese Hokkien music.

== Career ==
=== 1962–1984 ===
From 1962 to 1965, Yi participated in many singing competitions; in five singing competitions, including Tainan Victory Radio, Yunlin Huwei Radio, Changhua Guosheng Radio, Chiayi Radio and Nantou Caotun Radio, he won. One. When Yi was ten years old, he recorded the first single "A Duty Son's Wishes" to be included in the compilation. After Yi became an adult, he was invited by host Chang Fei to serve as the host of the show. The two performances in show venues all over Taiwan were very popular, and Yi has been a household name ever since. In 1982, Yi composed the single "Feelings" for Lin Huiping; it was the first song that Yi had written for others. He has since continued to help other singers compose lyrics and music.
