= Te'o =

Te'o is a Samoan surname. Notable people surnamed Te'o include:

- Ben Te'o (born 1987), New Zealand-born rugby union and rugby league footballer
- Daniel Te'o-Nesheim (1987–2017), Samoan American football outside linebacker
- Feleti Teo (born 1962), Tuvaluan politician and lawyer
- Fiatau Penitala Teo (1911–1998), Tuvaluan politician
- Manti Te'o (born 1991), American football linebacker
- Samuelu Teo, Tuvaluan politician

See also

- Vaiee, a Samoan village with Te'o as a chiefly title
- Teo (disambiguation)
