= Carl Chang =

Carl Chang may refer to:

- Carl Chang (businessman) (born 1969), American entrepreneur and former tennis coach
- Carl Chang (computer scientist), professor and chair of the Department of Computer Science at Iowa State University
