= Teo (surname) =

Teo is a Chinese surname (張、张 in Hokkien or Teochew)

- Charles Teo (born 1957), Australian neurosurgeon
- Teo Chee Hean (born 1954), Singaporean politician
- Teo Ho Pin (born 1960), Singaporean politician
- Josephine Teo (born 1968), Singaporean politician
- Nicholas Teo (born 1981), Malaysian Chinese singer
- Nicolette Teo (born 1986), Singaporean swimmer
- Sebastian Teo, Singaporean politician and businessman
- Teo Ser Luck (born 1968), Singaporean politician
- Teo Soon Kim (1904-1978), Singaporean lawyer
- Teo Ghim Heng (born 1975), Singaporean convicted murderer
- Teo Zi Ning (2013-2017), Singaporean murder victim who was killed by her father Teo Ghim Heng
- Felicia Teo Wei Ling (1988-2007), Singaporean student who was presumed missing in 2007 before she was revealed to be murdered
- Winnifred Teo Suan Lie (1967-1985), Singaporean student and victim of an unsolved rape and murder case

== See also ==
- Teo (disambiguation)
- Teo (given name), a given name
- Teoh
