= Cheung =

Cantonese surname

Cheung is a Cantonese romanization of several Chinese surnames, including 張 (simplified Chinese: 张; Jyutping: Zoeng1; pinyin: Zhāng; Wade–Giles: Chang^{1}; Vietnamese: Trương), 章 (Jyutping: Zoeng1; pinyin: Zhāng), and 蔣 (simplified Chinese: 蒋; Jyutping: Zoeng2; pinyin: Jiǎng).

It is a fairly common American surname, listed 3,672^{nd} during the 1990 United States census and 2,069^{th} during the year 2000 United States census.

== List of people with the surname ==
張 and 张

- Ada Cheung, Australian endocrinologist and researcher
- Andrew Cheung, Hong Kong judge and jurist
- Cecilia Cheung, Hong Kong actress and singer
- Cheung Chi Doy, Hong Kong-born footballer who represented Republic of China (Taiwan)
- Cheung Chi Wai, Hong Kong-born footballer who represented Republic of China (Taiwan)
- Dicky Cheung, Hong Kong actor and singer
- Jeffrey Cheung, American skateboarder and artist
- Jacky Cheung (1961-), Hong Kong actor and singer
- Karin Anna Cheung, American actress, singer, and songwriter
- Hins Cheung (1981–), Hong Kong actor and singer
- Leslie Cheung (1956–2003), Hong Kong actor and musician
- Louis Cheung, Hong Kong actor, singer, and songwriter
- Maggie Cheung, Hong Kong-British actress
- Margaret Chung (1889–1959), American physician
- Paul Cheung, Chinese entrepreneur
- Rachel Cheung (1991–), Hong Kong classical pianist
- Sharla Cheung or Cheung Man, Hong Kong actress
- Steven Cheung (political advisor), President Donald Trump's White House communications director
- Steven Ng-Sheong Cheung (1935–), Chinese economist
- Cheung Tat-ming (1964–), Hong Kong actor, comedian, director, and writer
- Teresa Cheung, Hong Kong singer
- Cheung Ka Long, Hong Kong fencer
- Martina Cheung, Irish business executive

== See also ==
- Zhang/Chang, for more about the surname within China
- Teoh, for general of Chinese people within Singapore, Malaysia and some other South-East Asia countries
