= Chong (surname) =

As a surname, Chong may refer to:

- a Mandarin romanization of the Chinese surnames Chong (崇)
- Hakka romanizations of the Chinese surnames Zhang (trad. 張, simp. 张), Zhang (章) and Zhuang (t 莊, s 庄)
- Cantonese and Gan romanizations of the Chinese surnames Zhang (trad. 張, simp. 张) and Zhang (章)
- a variant Minnan romanization of the Chinese surname Zheng (t 鄭, s 郑)
- a Cantonese romanization of the Chinese surnames Zhong (t 鍾, s 钟)
- Cantonese and Gan romanizations of the Chinese surname Zhuang (t 莊, s 庄)
- the McCune–Reischauer romanization of the Korean surname Jeong (정)

Chong is the 19th-most-common surname among Chinese Singaporeans and Malaysian Chinese, with 23,100 bearers in the year 2000. There were 10,740 Chongs found by the 2000 United States census, ranking Chong 2,561st most common overall and 96th most common among Asians and Pacific Islanders. Chong was also listed among the 200-most-common peculiarly Chinese surnames in a 2010 survey of the Registered Persons Database of Canadian health card recipients in the province of Ontario.

== List of persons with the surname ==
崇

- Chong Quan, Chinese politician

張 and 张

- Chong Chieng Jen, Malaysian politician
- Gordon Chong, Toronto politician
- Hon. Ida Chong, Canadian politician
- Ping Chong, American director, choreographer, and artist
- Chong Fah Cheong, Singaporean artist

章

- Chong Eng, Malaysian politician
- Chong Kah Kiat, Malaysian politician

鄭 and 郑

- Denise Chong, Canadian economist

鍾 and 钟

- Annabel Chong, stage name of Grace Quek, Singaporean-born American pornographic actress

莊 and 庄

- Kevin Chong, Hong Kong-born Canadian author
- Marcus Chong né Marcus Wyatt, adopted son of Tommy Chong, American actor
- Hon. Michael Chong, Canadian politician
- Michelle Chong (born 1977), Singaporean actress and director
- Peter Chong (criminal), former leader of the Wo Hop To syndicate
- Rae Dawn Chong, daughter of Tommy Chong, Canadian actress
- Robbi Chong, daughter of Tommy Chong, Canadian actress and model
- Tommy Chong (born 1938), Canadian-born American comedian and actor
- Elkie Chong (born 1998), Hong Kong singer, dancer, member of the South Korean group CLC

Unknown

- Cecile Chong, American artist
- Christina Chong, British actress
- Daniel Chong, American Pixar director
- Eileen Chong, Singaporean politician
- Guillermo Chong, Chilean geologist
- Jason Chong, Australian actor
- John Chong, Hong Kong film producer and presenter
- John Chong (beekeeper), Singaporean beekeeper
- Kristian Chong, 21st-century Australian concert pianist
- Miguel Ángel Osorio Chong, Mexican politician
- Pono Chong, Hawaiian politician
- Susien Chong, fashion designer
- Tahith Chong, professional association football player
- Peter Loy Chong, Catholic archbishop of Suva, Fiji
