= Death of Linda Chua =

2000 unsolved rape and murder of a woman in Singapore

Linda Chua
- Born: 1972; Singapore
- Died: 14 February 2000 (aged 27–28); Bukit Batok, Singapore
- Cause of death: Murder
- Education: Nanyang Technological University
- Occupation: Finance executive
- Known for: Murder victim

On 6 February 2000, 27-year-old Linda Chua was jogging in Bukit Batok Nature Park when she was attacked and raped. She was later found naked in a 10-metre-deep ravine in the park with her clothes next to her. She was taken to the National University Hospital but died several days later on 14 February. Her attackers were never caught and the case remains unsolved to this day.

== Background ==
Linda Chua, the second of four children of a retired businessman and a housewife, was a financial reporting manager at ExxonMobil. She had a fiancé, whom she met while they were both freshmen at Nanyang Technological University in 1991. They had been planning to get married in December that year.

== Investigations ==
Police interviewed hundreds of people, but did not find any useful leads.

In March, Singaporean TV crime show Crimewatch broadcast a public appeal for information about the case in the show's first episode that year.

On 29 March, citizens' groups, the public and Chua's friends offered a reward of $80,000 for information about the culprits behind the attack.

== See also ==
- List of unsolved murders
- List of major crimes in Singapore
- Death of Winnifred Teo
- Murder of Dini Haryati
