= Teoman =

Teoman (IPA: [teoˈman]) is a masculine Turkish given name and a surname that means commander, from the historical leader Touman. Recently, the name Teo has appeared as a nickname of Teoman. Notable people with the name include:

== Given name ==
- Teoman Alibegović (born 1967), Slovenian basketball player
- Ali Teoman Germaner (1934–2018) Turkish sculptor
- Teoman Gündüz (born 2004), Turkish footballer
- Teoman Koman (c. 1936–2013), Turkish general
- Teoman (singer), stage name of Fazlı Teoman Yakupoğlu (born 1967), Turkish acoustic rock singer-songwriter
- Teoman Örge (born 1990), Turkish basketball player

== Surname ==
- Funda Teoman (born 1984), Turkish pro basketball referee

== See also ==
- Teoman (wrestler), Turkish-German professional wrestler formerly known as Lucky Kid
- Turkish name
