= Teo =

Teo or TEO may refer to:

== Arts and entertainment ==
- Teo (album), a 1957 album by Teo Macero and the Prestige Jazz Quartet
- "Teo", a song by Miles Davis from his 1961 album Someday My Prince Will Come
- "Teo", a song by Thelonious Monk from his 1964 album Monk
- Teo McDohl, a character in the video game Suikoden
- Teo, the paraplegic Earth Kingdom son of a mechanist who appears in Avatar: The Last Airbender
- Teo, a 1999 animated television series produced by BRB International and Violeta Denou
- "Téo & Téa", the sixteenth studio album by French electronic musician and composer Jean-Michel Jarre, released in 2007
- "Teo", a song by the American band Bright from their 1997 album The Albatross Guest House

== People ==
- Teo (given name), a given name
- Teo (surname), a surname
- Te'o (disambiguation), a Samoan surname
- Téo, stage name of American singer and actor Mateo Arias (born 1995)
- Teo (Belarusian singer), also known as Yuriy Vashchuk (born 1983)
- Teo, stage name of Romanian stand-up comedian and writer Claudiu Teohari (born 1981)

== Other uses ==
- Teo, A Coruña, a municipality in the Spanish province of A Coruña
- Emisor Oriente Tunnel a wastewater tunnel in Mexico City (Túnel Emisor Oriente in Spanish).
- Teo LT telecommunications company in Lithuania
- Teo., a suffix for a private company limited by shares in Ireland
- TeO, Tellurium monoxide, a chemical compound
- TEO, a subdivision of the Inferior temporal cortex (IT) of the brain
- TEO, the National Rail station code for Theobalds Grove railway station, Hertfordshire, England
- TEO, an abbreviation for the Finnish National Authority for Medicolegal Affairs

== See also ==
- Teoh, the Min-nan spelling of the Chinese surname Zhang
- Teos ancient Ionian city
