= Cecile Chong =

American artist

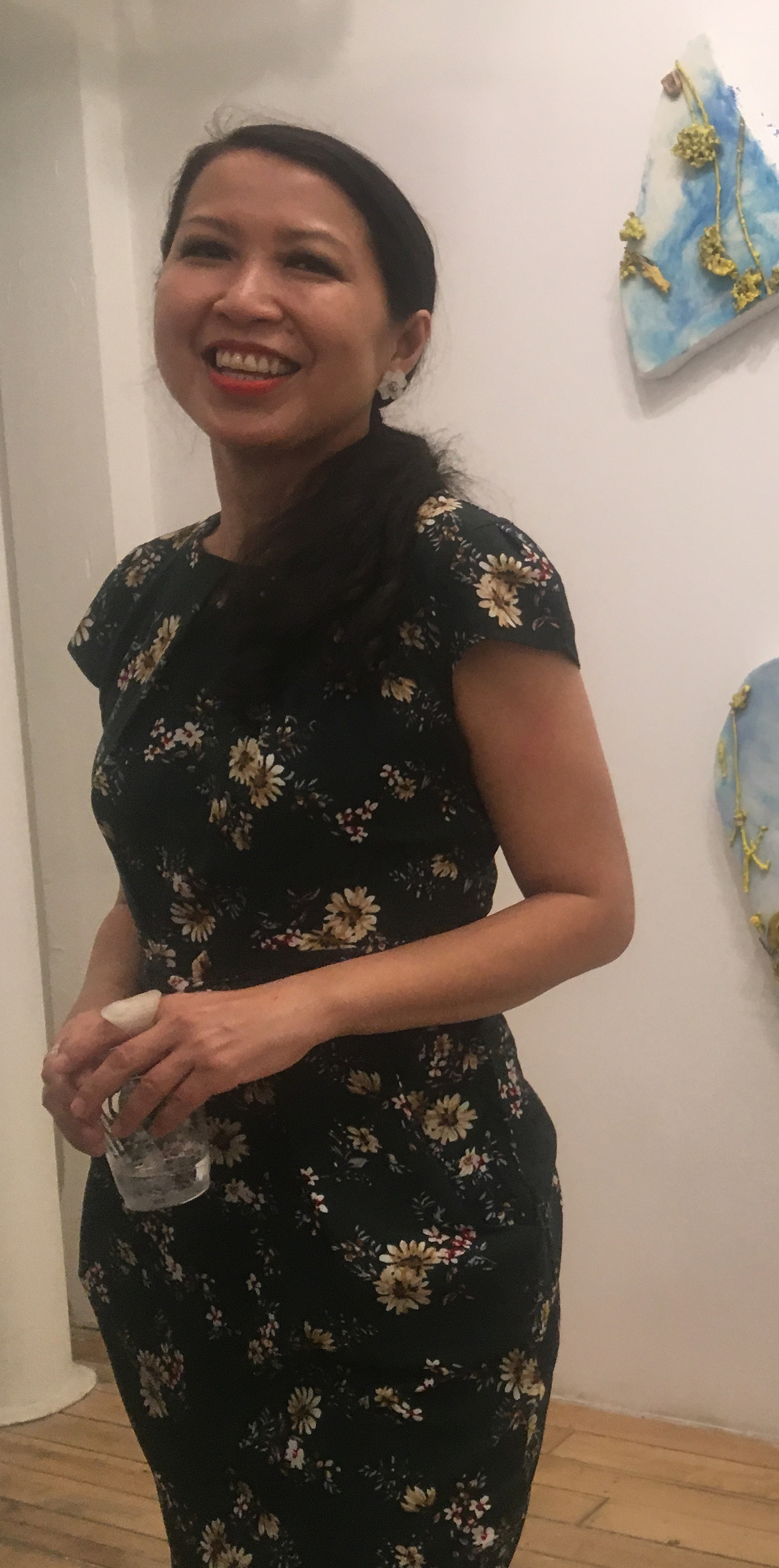
- Cecile Chong at The Painting Center opening Mar 2018
- Born: Cecile Chong; 1964 (age 61–62); Guayaquil, Ecuador
- Education: Queens College; Hunter College; Parsons School of Design
- Known for: Painting, Drawing, Installation, Sculpture
- Awards: The Joan Mitchell MFA Grant (2011), EFA studio program (current)
- Website: https://www.cecilechong.com/

Cecile Chong is an American artist based in Brooklyn, New York, whose work addresses the process of cultural assimilation and the development of individual identity. For many years she has contributed to New York City public school art programs as a teaching artist.

== Early life ==
Cecile Chong was born in Guayaquil Ecuador. She went to China when she was 10, attending the Sacred Heart Conossian School in Macau, and then at 15 returned to Ecuador to attend the International section of the Colegio Americano High School in Quito. She came to New York City at age 19 to study art.

== Background and education ==
She studied studio art at Queens College, receiving a BA in 1988. She received a master's degree in art education at Hunter College in 1994. During graduate studies at the Parsons School of Design she was challenged to explore her own, genuine and constructive narrative, receiving an MFA degree in 2008.

== Selected works and exhibitions ==
2015 - Time Collision - in the Project Room of BRIC Arts Media Chong presented an installation of Eastern and Western objects and images in landscape format mixing cultural incongruities.

2018 In Between Daylight, FiveMyles Gallery, Brooklyn NY consisted of a large wall installation of artificial and real flora with small guagua's facing it. and represents the risk, danger and beauty of the immigrant journey.

2017 - 2019 El Dorado - The New Forty-niners is a New York City installation of many small swaddled baby (guagua) sculptures. Forty-nine percent of the figures are painted gold, representing the percentage of NYC households that speak a language other than English. Speaking to issues of immigration, the installation as such re-images a present-day wealthy metropolis. Sunset Park in Brooklyn was the first public park iteration as it travels to the five boroughs of NYC; Lewis Latimer House Museum in Flushing Queens was a second in 2018; and a third appeared in the Bronx at a 2019 Wave Hill summer group show described as a multi-piece “guagua” sculptural installation and a tribute to New York City's immigrant populations.

Solo exhibitions

- 2017 Selena Gallery, Brooklyn, NY
- 2015 BRIC Arts Media, Brooklyn, NY
- 2013 Emerson Gallery Berlin, Germany,
- 2014 Honey Ramka Project Space,
- 2012 Figuresworks,
- 2011 Praxis International Art Project Space,
- 2010 ArtSPACE
- 2008 Corridor Gallery

== Fellowships and residencies ==
- EFA studio program, current
- Joan Mitchell Center Residency 2017
- Wave Hill Winter Workspace Residency 2017
- Lower East Side Printshop 2016–2017
- MASS MoCA Studios Residency
- Jerome Foundation Travel and Study Grant 2015
- The Center for Book Arts Residency 2013
- Socrates Sculpture Park 2011
- AIM - Bronx Museum 2011
- Urban Artist Initiative NYC 2009
- Aljira Emerge
- the Joan Mitchell Foundation MFA Grant 2008
