= Philip Thomas Porter =

American electrical engineer (1930–2011)

Philip Thomas Porter (March 18, 1930 – March 30, 2011) was an American electrical engineer, one of the pioneers of cellular telephone networks.

== Education ==
Porter was born in rural Clinton, Kentucky, USA. He received a BA in physics (1952), MA in physics (1953), and a PhD (1955?) from Vanderbilt University, graduating magna cum laude and Phi Beta Kappa.

== Career ==
Porter was an engineer at Bell Laboratories during the years of transition from radio telephones to modern cellular mobile communications. Porter was the Bell Labs engineer who proposed that cell towers be at the corners of the hexagon cells rather than the centers and have directional antennas that would transmit and receive in 3 directions into 3 adjacent hexagon cells.

In Porter's design, the cell sites can flexibly assign channels to handheld phones based on signal strength, allowing the same frequency to be re-used in various locations without interference. This allowed a larger number of phones to be supported over a geographical area. His work in preorigination dialing (entering the number, then hitting the Send key), improved efficiency of placing cell phone calls.

During the 1960s and 1970s, Porter was a key partner in the international negotiation of bandwidths and international standards involving systems, signaling, and controlling implications of cellular service. These activities led to cellular service becoming commercial viable.

He was the recipient of several awards for his work, notably from the IEEE (engineering society). As of January 1, 1990, Porter was elected an IEEE Fellow "for contributions to the planning, definition, and design of mobile cellular radio communications and services."

After spending much of his adult life in New Jersey near the Bell Laboratories headquarters where he worked, Porter retired to WellSpring in Greensboro, North Carolina in 2000. Porter was inducted into the Wireless Hall of Fame in 2016 as a recognition for his role in the cellular industry.

He and his wife Louise (Jett) Porter had a daughter Sara Shelby Taylor, a son Philip C. Porter, and three grandchildren.

== Publications ==
Li Fung Chang and Philip T. Porter, "Data Services in a TDMA Digital Portable Radio System", Global Telecommunications Conf., GLOBECOM '90, 1990.

Li Fung Chang and Philip T. Porter, "Performance comparison of antenna diversity and slow frequency hopping for the TDMA portable radio channel", IEEE Transactions on Vehicular Technology, pages 222-229, vol 38, issue 4, 1989.

Philip T. Porter, "Relationships for Three-dimensional Modeling of Co-channel Reuse", IEEE Vehicular Technology Conference, Pages 6–11, vol 35, 1985.

Verne H. MacDonald, Philip T. Porter, W. Rae Young, "Cellular high capacity mobile radiotelephone system with fleet-calling arrangement for dispatch service", U.S. patent 4,399,555, filed April 28, 1980, issued August 16, 1983.

Z. C. Fluhr and Philip T. Porter, "AMPS: Control Architecture", Bell System Technical Journal, vol. 58, 1, pages 1–14, January 1979, Advanced Mobile Phone System.

Richard H. Frenkiel, Joel S. Engle, and Philip T. Porter, "High Capacity Mobile Telephone System Feasibility Studies and System Plan", proposal filed with the FCC in 1971.

== See also ==
- History of mobile phones#Cellular concepts
- Richard H. Frenkiel
- Joel S. Engel
- W. Rae Young
- Li Fung Chang
