= Xinying =

Xinying is the Mandarin Pinyin spelling of a Chinese female given name. The same name is also spelled Hsin-ying in Mandarin Wade-Giles (used in Taiwan) and Sum-wing in Cantonese pronunciation.

People with this name include:

- Cynthia Wu (born 1978), Taiwanese business executive and politician
- Hsieh Hsin-ying (born 1985), Taiwanese actress and model
- Hsu Hsin-ying (born 1972), Taiwanese politician
- Jacqueline Wong (born 1989), Hongkonger-American actress
- Tina Lim Xin Ying (born 1988), student who was last seen in Choa Chu Kang, Singapore on 22 June 2002.

== Other uses ==
- Xinying District, Tainan City, Taiwan
- Xinying Township (新盈镇), Lingao County, Hainan
