= Sheung (surname) =

Sheung is a Cantonese romanization of the Chinese surnames 常 (Cháng) and 商 (Shāng).

It's a very uncommon surname in the United States, with fewer than 100 people sharing it during the year 2000 US Census.

== List of persons with the surname ==
商

- Kiki Sheung (born 1963), Hong Kong actress

常

- Nancy Sheung (1914–1979), Hong Kong photographer

== See also ==
- Chang (surname), for more about that surname in mainland China and on Taiwan
- Shang (surname), for more about that surname in mainland China and on Taiwan
