= Death of Winnifred Teo =

Unsolved rape and murder case of a female jogger in Singapore (1985)

Winnifred Teo Suan Lie
- An undated photo of Winnifred Teo before her death
- Born: Winnifred Teo Suan Lie; 29 March 1967; Singapore
- Died: 22 May 1985 (aged 18); Old Holland Road, Singapore
- Cause of death: Murdered by stabbing
- Resting place: A cemetery in Singapore
- Education: Final year of pre-university education at Catholic Junior College (incomplete due to her death)
- Occupation: Student
- Known for: Murder victim

On the evening of 22 May 1985, 18-year-old Winnifred Teo Suan Lie (张碹丽 Zhāng Xuànlì), then a student of Catholic Junior College, went out for an evening jog as usual, but never came back. The next morning, Teo's naked body was found lying in the undergrowth off Old Holland Road, Singapore. She had several stab wounds on her body and was sexually assaulted prior to her death. Autopsy reports showed that Teo was restrained and put up a fierce struggle against her killer(s) before her death from excessive blood loss.

The brutality of Teo's rape and murder brought great shock across the whole of Singapore in 1985. Although the police extensively investigated the case, the killer(s) were never caught. Teo's murder case is one of Singapore's most notable unsolved murder cases.

== Background and case ==
=== Life of Winnifred Teo ===
Born in 1967, Winnifred Teo Suan Lie was the second of three children, and she had both an elder sister and a younger brother. She was a final-year pre-university student at Catholic Junior College. Her father Teo Joo Kim was a company director of a timber firm. At the time Teo was murdered, her sister, Martina Teo Suan Siew (aged 20 in 1985), was studying overseas in Australia and her younger brother, Gerald Teo (aged 16 in 1985), was studying in St Joseph's Institution. Teo was also said to have attended the St Ignatius Church in King's Road regularly. Due to her waist-long hair and tanned skin, Teo was mistaken for a Eurasian when she was actually an ethnic Chinese Singaporean.

According to her teachers, classmates and family, Teo was a model student and well-liked in school. At her school, she was the student counsellor, enjoyed taking part in adventure camps, and was an active student in physical activities. During the final days leading up to her death, Teo jogged in the evenings to prepare herself for a school adventure camp. She could not find time to do so in school due to heavy schoolwork. Several joggers, like 16-year-old Anglo-Chinese School student Tan Meng Yan, 20-year-old polytechnic graduate Chao Tah Jin and his 16-year-old younger brother Chao Tar Wee, remembered often seeing Teo jogging or cycling along Holland Road, a popular place for joggers and where many female joggers often jogged alone. The Chao brothers described Teo as pretty, with long flowing hair. They said she usually wore pink jogging shoes and brief shorts during her jogs but never spoke to her due to her being stern-looking.

=== Final jog and death ===
On the evening of 22 May 1985, Teo went out for a jog at Bukit Batok Nature Park as usual, leaving her Maryland Drive terrace house at 6:00 PM. It was the last time Teo's mother saw her alive.

After 14 hours, Teo had still not returned home and her mother became concerned about her safety. At 04:00 AM on May 23rd, she contacted the police and reported Teo as missing. Officers from Tanglin Police Division conducted a search for Teo in the nearby areas where she usually jogged. The naked body of Teo was found six hours later by police, lying in the undergrowth at Old Holland Road, about four metres from the road and nearly 1.5 km from her home. Teo's body was covered with mud and bruises, and there were six stab wounds to her neck. Her hands were tied with her T-shirt, and her shoes, shorts and watch were found abandoned in the nearby surroundings. It was suspected that Teo was raped before her death.

The news of her death shocked and saddened her family, as well as the students and teachers at her school. The school's students underwent a school-organised mourning period and received early dismissals following the discovery of Teo's body. Her father, who was on a business trip in Munich, Germany, immediately flew back home. Over 500 people, including family members and classmates, showed up at her funeral to mourn Teo's death. The murder of Teo led to Raffles Junior College warning its 1,700 students that girls should move in groups of "at least two or three". The female students were also told not to travel alone on lonely roads to and from school, and to not take shortcuts. Other schools similarly warned their students against travelling alone outdoors.

== Police investigations ==
The case of Winnifred Teo's murder was transferred to the Special Investigation Section of the CID for investigation. The police offered a S$50,000 reward for fresh information leading to the arrest and conviction of the killer(s). The offer, which was valid until 31 December 1985, was made because the police had few leads to investigate Teo's murder. The reward did not draw any new information to help solve the case. An autopsy report by pathologist Clarence Lim confirmed that Teo was raped before her death, and she was attacked by more than one person. She also showed signs of struggle and resistance against her attackers during the sexual assault and stabbing. The weapon, speculated to be a sharp-edged instrument, was never found despite extensive searches by the police. Over 200 police officers were deployed during the manhunt for the suspects.

The police also interrogated joggers and other people who often passed by the areas where Teo usually jogged, but they could not find any suspects among these people. They arrested a man who often exposed himself in front of female joggers in the area sometime before Teo's death, but the man was released as no connection could be made between him and Teo's case. A 1987 update revealed the police were still reviewing the case and there were no new leads. During a 1991 hearing at the coroner's court, the police stated that there was still no progress in their ongoing investigation of Teo's case. The police also could not find any motive behind the murder. They speculated that it might be due to a business-related rivalry with Teo's father, who was her father's favourite child. However, this was refuted.

Despite the efforts of the police, the killer(s) of Teo were never identified or found.

== Aftermath ==
=== Suspected serial killing ===
In February 2000, 27-year-old financial executive Linda Chua was found brutally assaulted and raped at Bukit Batok Nature Park while jogging there. She died eight days later while hospitalized. The police, having found similarities in the circumstances surrounding the cases of Winnifred Teo and Chua, suspected that the killing of Teo could be the work of the same person who raped and killed Chua, and even suspected that Teo's murderer might be a serial killer. However, the autopsy report of Chua's case showed differences in the manner of attack on Chua compared to Teo's; the 'serial killing' theory was refuted.

=== Notoriety ===
The case of Winnifred Teo went on to become one of Singapore's most infamous unsolved murder cases. There were two more murder cases, such as the 1998 unsolved rape-murder of Dini Haryati and 2000 rape-murder of Linda Chua, in which the victims, who went outdoors alone, faced a similar fate to Teo.

In 2021, due to the renewed public attention to the unsolved 1995 rape-murder of seven-year-old Lim Shiow Rong, as well as the arrest of Ahmad Danial Mohamed Rafa'ee for the alleged murder of missing student Felicia Teo Wei Ling, the Winnifred Teo case and those of Dini and Chua were again caught in public spotlight as they were also unsolved, their killer(s) not arrested and/or their victims being raped and killed.

== See also ==
- Capital punishment in Singapore
- Death of Felicia Teo
- Death of Linda Chua
- Death of Lim Shiow Rong
- List of major crimes in Singapore
- List of unsolved murders (1980–1999)
