= Theophylact =

Theophylact or Theophylactus (Latin: Theophylactus; Greek: Θεοφύλακτος Theophylaktos, "guarded by God") may refer to:

- Theophylact Simocatta (7th century), Byzantine author and historian
- Theophylact (exarch) (died 710), Exarch of Ravenna
- Patriarch Theophylactus of Alexandria (7th–8th centuries), coadjutor Greek Orthodox Patriarch of Alexandria
- Theophylact of Antioch (8th century), Greek Orthodox Patriarch of Antioch
- Archdeacon Theophylact (8th century), archdeacon of the Roman Church
- Theophylact Rhangabe (8th century), Byzantine admiral
- Peter of Atroa (773–837), born Theophylact
- Theophylact of Nicomedia (died 845), Bishop of Nicomedia
- Theophylact (son of Michael I) (793–849), Byzantine co-emperor
- Theophylact I, Count of Tusculum (9th–10th centuries)
- Theophylact of Constantinople (917–956), Patriarch of Constantinople
- Theophylact Dalassenos (10th–11th centuries)
- Theophylact Botaneiates (died 1014)
- Pope Benedict VIII (died 1024), born Theophylact
- Pope Benedict IX (died c. 1056), born Theophylact
- Theophylact of Ohrid (died c. 1107), Archbishop of Ohrid and biblical commentator
- Metropolitan Theophylactos of Australia (1891–1958), Greek Orthodox Metropolitan of Australia
