= Lower East Side Printshop =

- Lower East Side Printshop
- Formation: 1968; 58 years ago
- Founder: Eleanor Magid
- Type: Non-profit arts organization
- Location: 306 W 37th St, New York City, New York 10018
- Coordinates: 40.755285°N 73.992739°W
- Services: print editions service, classes, artist residencies, art studio space
- Website: www.printshop.org

Lower East Side Printshop, also known as L.E.S. Printshop (founded in 1968) is a nonprofit arts organization and printmaking studio located in New York City. They offer studio space, artist residencies, classes, artwork for sale and printing editions services. They work with approximately 160 artists per year, which makes this one of the largest printmaking shops in the country.

== History ==
It was founded in 1968, by Eleanor Magid during a New York City school strike. Eleanor Magid was a printmaker, studying under Robert Blackburn. Magid brought her young daughter's classmates and neighbors to the print studio during the strike and she taught them classes on printmaking. The studio was originally based in the East Village, and in 2005 the facility moved to a larger site in Midtown Manhattan.
