= Carl Chang (computer scientist) =

American computer scientist

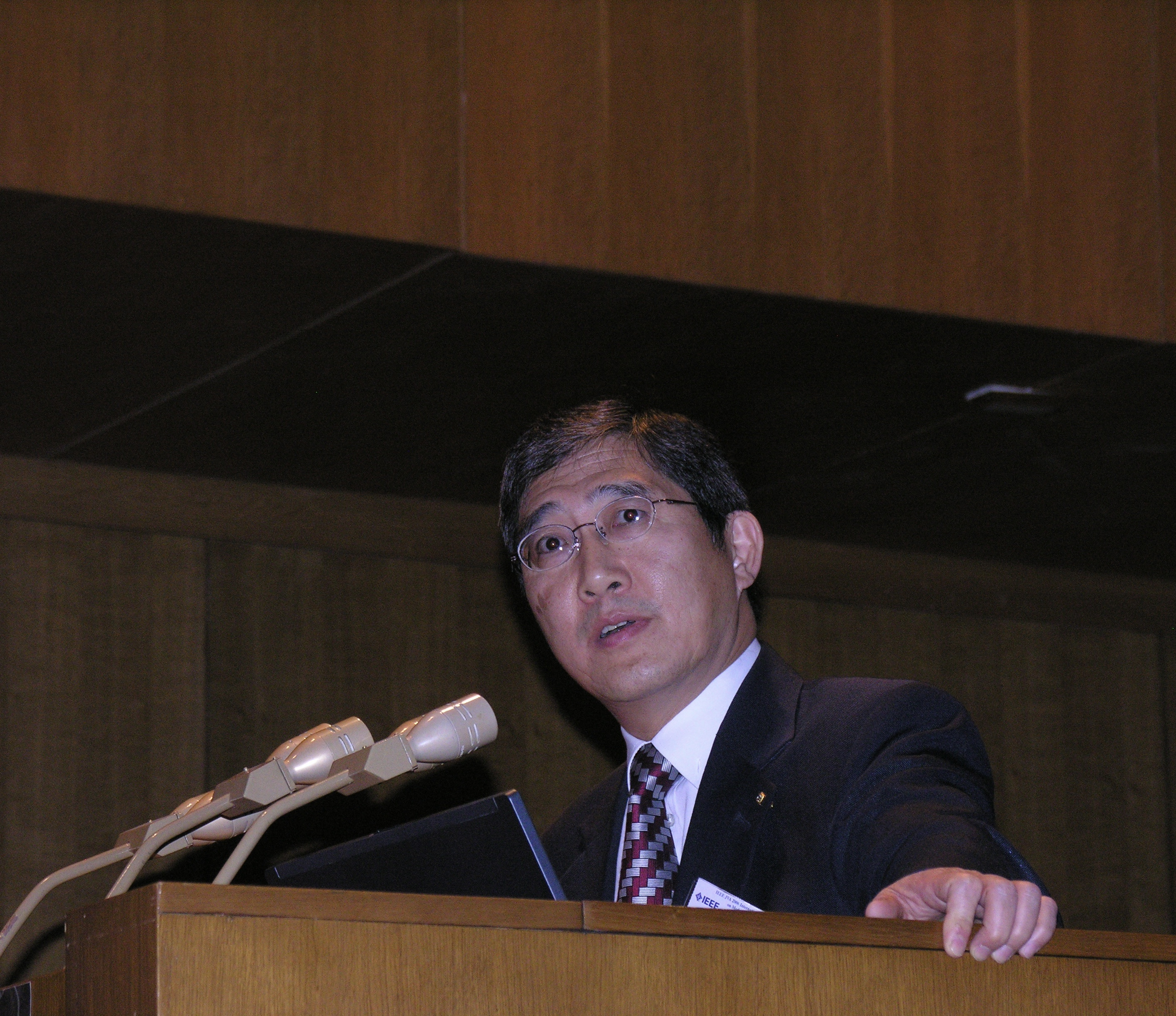
- Chang in 2010
- Born: Kochao Chang; March 5, 1952 (age 74); Taichung, Taiwan
- Citizenship: United States
- Education: National Central University (BS); Northern Illinois University (MS); Northwestern University (PhD)
- Known for: Software Services Engineering; Requirements Engineering; Situation Analytics; Services Computing; Digital health
- Spouse: Jean Chang (1977–)
- Children: 3 (Kathy, Wilson, Renee)
- Awards: IEEE Third Millennium Medal (2000); Life Fellow of IEEE (2001-); Life Fellow of European Academy of Sciences(2002-); Fellow of AAAS (2003-); Bulgarian Academy of Sciences Marin Drinov Medal (2006); IEEE Richard E. Merwin Medal(2012); Overseas Distinguished Contribution Award of CCF(2014); Honorary Member of IPSJ (2019)
- Scientific career
- Fields: Computer Science
- Workplaces: Iowa State University
- Thesis: Incremental Modification of Computer Programs (1982)
- Doctoral advisor: Stephen Sik-Sang Yau (Chang's academic genealogy traced back to Thomas Edison)

Carl Kochao Chang (simplified Chinese: 张可昭; traditional Chinese: 張可昭; born 1952) is a Taiwanese-American computer scientist who is Professor of Computer Science, Professor of Human Computer Interaction and Director of Software Engineering Laboratory in the Department of Computer Science at Iowa State University, where he served as its department chair from 2002 to 2013.

== Career ==
He worked for GTE Automatic Electric and Bell Laboratories before joining the University of Illinois at Chicago in 1984, where he directed the International Center for Software Engineering. He served as Professor and Director for the Institute for Mobile, Pervasive, and Agile Computing Technologies (IMPACT) at Auburn University from 2001 to 2002, before moving to Iowa State University in July 2002 to take the department chair position. Chang was the 2004 IEEE Computer Society president. Previously he served as the Editor-in-Chief for IEEE Software (1991–1994) and Editor-in-Chief for IEEE Computer (2007–2010). He spearheaded the Computing Curricula 2001 (CC2001) project jointly sponsored by the IEEE Computer Society, the ACM, and the National Science Foundation. He is a Life Fellow of IEEE, a Fellow of AAAS, and a Life Fellow and an officer of the European Academy of Sciences. Chang retired from Iowa State University in 2022.

== Awards and recognition ==
He received the 2000 IEEE Third Millennium Medal, the 2006 Bulgaria Academy of Sciences Marin Drinov Medal, and the 2012 IEEE Computer Society Richard E. Merwin Medal. As a three times winner of IBM Faculty Award, Chang's research interests include software engineering, human computer interaction and digital health. He is the founder of Situation Analytics based on his Situ theoretical framework. He is the recipient of the 2014 Overseas Outstanding Contribution Award from China Computer Federation (CCF 中国计算机学会) as well as the 2014 Distinguished Alumnus by the National Central University in Taiwan (中央大學－台灣)。
