= Theoxena =

Theoxena may refer to:

- Theoxena of Syracuse (born before 317 BC; died after 289 BC), a Greek Macedonian noblewoman
- Theoxena of Egypt (fl. 4th/3rd century BC), a Syracusan princess, daughter of Theoxena of Syracuse
- Theoxena of Thessaly (fl. 3rd/2nd century BC), daughter of prince Herodicus of Thessaly; mentioned in De Mulieribus Claris
- Theoxena (moth), a genus of moths

== See also ==
- Theoxenia, a theme in Greek mythology demonstrating the importance of hospitality
