= Chang (surname) =

Cháng (常)
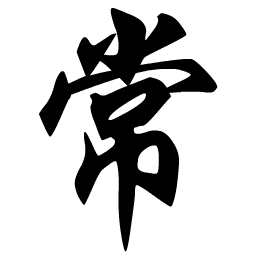

Origin
- Origin: Old Chinese
- Region of origin: China

Other names
- Derivatives: Kristian, Sukma (Indonesian)

Cháng (/tʃɑːŋ/) is the pinyin romanization of the Chinese surname 常 (Cháng). It was listed 80th among the Song-era Hundred Family Surnames.

"Chang" is also the Wade-Giles romanization of two Chinese surnames written Zhang in pinyin: one extremely common and written 張 in Traditional Chinese and 张 in Simplified Chinese, and another quite rare and written as 章 in both systems. There is also a rare case of 鄭 in Hong Kong written as Chang as well. For full details on them, see the "Zhang" 章 and "Zheng" 鄭 article. In Macao, this is the spelling of the surname "Zeng" 曾. "Chang" is also a common spelling of the surname 陈/陳 (Chen in Mandarin pinyin) in Peru.

== Romanization ==
常 is romanized as Ch'ang in Wade-Giles, although the apostrophe is often omitted in practice. It is romanized as Soeng and Sheung in Cantonese; Seong and Siông in Minnan languages; and Sioh in Teochew. It is occasionally romanized Sōng and Thōng as well.

It is the source of the Vietnamese surname Thường and the Korean surname romanized as Sang (상). It is also another Romanization of the Korean surname Jang.

In Japanese, it is romanized as Jō.

== Distribution ==
常 was unlisted among the most recent rankings of the 100 most common Chinese surnames in mainland China and on Taiwan based on household registrations in 2007, although the Ministry of Public Security in 2008 listed it as the 87th most common surname in China based on its database of National Identity Cards, shared by at least 2.4 million Chinese citizens. It was the 94th-most-common surname during the 1982 Chinese census.

"Chang" is a common Chinese surname in the United States, ranked 687th among all surnames during the 1990 census and 424th during the year 2000 census. It was ranked 11th among all surnames held by Asians and Pacific Islanders and 6th among all surnames held by Chinese Americans in 2000, well ahead of the pinyin variant "Zhang".

"Chang" is a common surname in Peru, where it was adopted by Cantonese immigrants as a variant spelling of Chen (陈 or 陳).

== Origin ==
The pronunciation of Chang in Old Chinese has been reconstructed as *daŋ. Its original meaning was "constant" or "often". By the time of Middle Chinese, the pronunciation had shifted to Dzyang.

== Notable people with the surname Chang ==
常

- Chang Yuchun (1330–1369), a Ming Dynasty general
- Elliott Charng, representative of the Republic of China to Australia

Others

- Ivan Miranda Chang, Peruvian tennis player.
- Meiyang Chang, Chinese-Indian television artist
- Tiffany Chang (born 2003) Taiwanese-American beauty pageant titleholder, media personality.

Fictional characters

- Chang, a henchman in the James Bond film Moonraker played by the Franco-Japanese aikido instructor Toshiro Suga
- Cho Chang, a character in the Harry Potter novels officially Sinified as 张秋 (Zhang Qiu), sometimes alternately claimed by Cantonese Caos or even Korean Chos
- Kim Chang, a character in the television show Casualty, played by actress Jasmine Bayes.
- Leia Chang, a character in the television show Degrassi: The Next Generation, played by actress Judy Jiao
- Mike Chang, a Chinese American character in the TV series Glee, played by actor Harry Shum Junior
- Michelle Chang, a part-Native-American, part-Chinese fighter in the video game franchise, Tekken.
- Julia Chang, Michelle Chang's adopted daughter, a Native-American fighter and ecologist in the video game franchise, Tekken.
- Tina Cohen-Chang, a Chinese American character in the TV series Glee, played by actress Jenna Ushkowitz
- Chang Chong-Chen, a character in The Adventures of Tintin series, inspired by Hergé's real-life friend Zhang Chongren
- Ben Chang, a character in the TV series Community, played by actor Ken Jeong
- Manpukumaru Chang, a character from Valkyrie Drive- Bhikkhuni
- Corki Chang and her father Mr. Chang, characters from Make It Pop
- The Chang family (Sid, Adelaide, Becca, and Stanley), a group of characters who mainly appear in The Casagrandes

== See also ==
- Xu (surname 徐)
- List of common Chinese surnames
