= Tiffany Chang =

Taiwanese-American beauty pageant contestant

Tiffany Chang (born November 20, 2003), also known by her Mandarin name Zhang Fang Yu (張芳瑜), is a Taiwanese-American beauty pageant titleholder, media personality, and model who was crowned 2024 Miss Asia USA. The first Taiwanese-American to win Miss Asia USA, Chang was previously crowned Miss Taiwanese American 2022.

== Early life ==
For elementary school, Chang attended Clairbourn School and went on to attend Westridge School for Girls in Pasadena.

== Education ==
As of 2024, Chang was studying Engineering Management & Human-Centered Design at Stanford University. While studying at Stanford, she has worked as a research student assistant at the Stanford Center for Pacific and Asian Studies and as an intern at the artificial intelligence company Intumit.

== Career ==
In 2014, while she was in sixth grade, Chang founded the nonprofit organization Madhatter Knits, which provides knitted wool hats for premature babies in the NICU.

Chang was crowned Miss Taiwanese American in August 2022. She became known for building a robot for the talent show portion of the pageant.

Chang served as the English host for President Tsai Ing-wen's 2023 visit to Los Angeles. Chang was photographed for the cover of the September/October 2023 issue of Lotus Magazine.

In November 2023, Chang was crowned Miss Asia USA 2024. At the pageant, she also received the Popularity Award, Audience Choice Award, Best Swimsuit, and Best Evening Gown awards. After the pageant, Chang visited the Tzu Chi Taipei Eastern District Liaison Office in March 2024 to speak with fans and visitors. She went on to tour Taiwan with the current Miss Taiwanese American, MimiQ Soong. She also took part in the Huntington Beach Fourth of July Parade.

Chang has walked the runway as a model at fashion shows and events such as Los Angeles Fashion Week, the International Women's Day Gala, and Miami Swim Week. She has modeled for designers such as David Tupaz, Sue Wong, and the brand Bon L'ete. She has appeared in magazines such as Hollywood Weekly, The Los Angeles Times, and the World Journal.
