= Li Fung Chang =

Taiwanese communications engineer

Li Fung Chang (Chinese: 張麗鳳) is a Taiwanese communications engineer, since 2015 the chief architect of Taiwan's 5G cellular communications network program office in the ministry of economic affairs, and a chair professor of electrical and computer engineering at National Chiao Tung University.

== Education and career ==
Chang completed a PhD in 1985 at the University of Illinois Urbana-Champaign, with the dissertation An Information-Theoretic Study of Ratio-Threshold Antijam Techniques supervised by coding theorist Robert McEliece. Prior to her current position in Taiwan, she has worked for Telcordia, AT&T Labs, and Broadcom.

== Recognition ==
Chang was named a Fellow of the IEEE in 2001, "for contributions to the design and analysis of radio links and networks for wireless voice/data services".
