= Disappearance of Tina Lim =

2002 missing person case in Singapore

Tina Lim Xin Ying
- Born: Tina Lim Xin Ying c. 1988; Singapore
- Disappeared: June 22, 2002 (aged 14); Singapore
- Status: Missing for 24 years, 4 months and 11 days, declared dead in absentia in 2010
- Other name: Tina Lin Xin Ying
- Occupation: Student
- Height: 1.6 m (5 ft 3 in)
- Parents: Lim Boon Kee (father); Goh Bee Leng (mother)

Locations
1 Choa Chu Kang, where Lim was last seen.

Tina Lim Xin Ying (Note: Her English name was also spelt as Tina Lin Xin Ying.) (Chinese: 林欣莹; pinyin: Lín Xīnyíng) was a 14-year-old student who was last seen in Choa Chu Kang, Singapore on 22 June 2002.

== Background ==
Tina Lim Xin Ying, born in 1988, was the eldest child of Lim Boon Kee (Chinese: 林文枝; pinyin: Lín Wénzhī). Some time after Tina was born, Lim divorced his wife, remarried and had two sons and one daughter with his new wife. Tina remained under Lim's care.

== Disappearance ==
At about 4:15 PM on 22 June 2002, Tina, then a Secondary Two student in Unity Secondary School, was last seen heading out of her Choa Chu Kang flat to pay her ailing grandfather a visit. Before leaving, Tina called her aunt, who stayed in the same block as Tina's grandfather in Jurong. She never showed up at her grandfather's house.

According to Lim, at the time of her disappearance, she had only $10 in her wallet, did not bring any clothes with her, and her passport was still at home, which made it very unlikely that she had planned to run away.

== Search ==
Following Tina's disappearance, Tina's father, Lim Boon Kee, put up over 7,000 missing person posters. When he could not find Tina in Singapore, he continued his search in neighbouring Malaysia, in areas including Penang, Ipoh, Sarawak, and even the border with Thailand. As Lim's contact number was printed on the posters, he received a number of prank calls every day, and some of the callers said that Tina had met with an accident. None of the callers provided any useful clues about Tina's whereabouts.

During his search, Lim left his three younger children under the care of his wife. His wife had to work long hours to support the family. This led to disagreements and the couple divorced.

Tina's grandfather, who she had left to visit on the day she went missing, died on 28 October 2003. Tina's father put a note in the newspaper obituary which read: "Tina, your grandfather who loved you very much has passed away. Please come and see him for the last time." On 1 November, the last day of the funeral wake, the family received several mysterious phone calls. Lim took the call, but the caller remained silent. Police investigations traced the phone calls to a home in Pasir Ris. After interviewing the family residing there, the police determined that Tina did not make the call. Tina's family, however, was not convinced, and believed the call came from Tina.

After the incident at Tina's grandfather's funeral, Tina was not seen or heard from again. In 2010, Lim declared Tina dead in absentia with the help of a lawyer. As of August 2026, Tina is still missing.

== Aftermath ==
In 2004, the disappearance of Tina Lim was portrayed on Singaporean television series Missing on the fourth episode of its first season.

== See also ==
- List of people who disappeared mysteriously (2000–present)
