= Death of Lim Shiow Rong =

Unsolved case of girl raped and murdered in Singapore in 1995

Lim Shiow Rong
- A photograph of Lim Shiow Rong at her kindergarten graduation.
- Born: Lim Shiow Rong; 2 November 1988; Singapore
- Died: 25 June 1995 (aged 6); Jalan Woodbridge, Singapore
- Cause of death: Homicide by strangulation
- Resting place: A cemetery in Singapore
- Other name: Ah Girl
- Education: Primary One at Poi Ching School (incomplete due to her death)
- Occupation: Student
- Known for: Murder victim

On 25 June 1995, a six-year-old schoolgirl named Lim Shiow Rong (林秀蓉 Lín Xiùróng) was found dead in a forested area near Jalan Woodbridge, Singapore. Found in a semi-sitting position, Lim was later found to have been raped and strangled. There was a possibility that Lim was murdered by someone known to her and/or her family, as according to her mother, Lim told her that she was going to see a friend of her father's before leaving her mother's coffee shop on the night before her body was discovered.

The police investigated the case, and also obtained a police sketch of the suspect's face. However, the killer was not caught, and the case remains open. The case regained attention 26 years later, when the bereaved family appealed to the public for information to urge police to continue their investigations into Lim's murder. The police confirmed they were still investigating the case.

== Case ==
=== Background ===
Born on 2 November 1988, Lim Shiow Rong, who was a student of Poi Ching School, was the eldest of two daughters. Her sister, Jia Hui, was born in 1994. Her mother, Ang Goon Lay (aged 38 in 1995), was the owner of a coffee shop in Block 75 Toa Payoh Lorong 7, while her father, Lim Kim Siong (aged 46 in 1995), was reported to have previously served time in prison for drug-related offences.

According to her family, neighbours and the coffee shop's hawkers, Lim was known as "Ah Girl," and she loved riding her bicycle in the hawker centre, where her mother would work from 4:00 PM to 11:00 PM daily, but had little time to take care of her daughters. She also often went to play at the playground nearby. A teacher surnamed Chew from Lim's former school described her as "very hyperactive and streetwise", "boyish", and "aggressive". The girl was said to be a very friendly child, even to strangers. This was confirmed by a Madam Chia, a family friend of Lim's parents, who stated that the girl was so friendly that she would always follow any person who claimed to be her father's friend.

=== Disappearance and murder ===
On the night of 24 June 1995, at 9:30 PM, Lim was hanging out at her mother's coffee shop. She ate her chocolate cereal and told her mother she was going out to meet a friend of her father. Even though Ang advised against going, Lim left the coffee shop. That was the last time Ang saw her daughter alive. Ang never got to ask who the friend was before her child's departure.

By 11:00 PM, Lim still had not returned, even after Ang closed her coffee stall and shop. Out of concern, she went around Toa Payoh searching for her daughter. The search went on until daybreak, but there was no sign of Lim. At 9:00 AM the next morning, Ang and Lim's grandmother lodged a police report, reporting Lim missing. Unknown to Lim's family, an hour before the missing persons report was lodged, the police had received a report from a teenager that he had discovered the corpse of a young girl at Jalan Woodbridge, where he was playing football. The corpse was identified as six-year-old Lim Shiow Rong, placed in a semi-sitting position in a drain, about 8 km away from Lim's house. Investigations revealed that Lim was murdered by strangulation, and she was sexually assaulted prior to her death. Blood stains were found on her underwear, and Lim's face was covered with injuries inflicted before her death.

According to the national newspaper The Straits Times, Ang, who received news of her daughter's death, told the journalists, "When I went to identify her body, my daughter had what looked like finger imprints around her neck and blood on her mouth, but her face was at peace, as though she was only asleep." Lim's father was reported to be serving his latest sentence at a drug rehabilitation centre for drug-related offences at the time of the incident, and was only there for one week when he received news of his daughter's murder. Lim's father was allowed a temporary leave from prison to attend his daughter's funeral.

== Police investigations ==
A sketch of the possible suspect and killer behind Lim Shiow Rong's murder case.

The police began to investigate Lim Shiow Rong's murder, and received several clues that could have pointed to a suspect.

According to Lim's mother, she said there was a male customer who behaved suspiciously at the coffee shop. He would come between 8:00 PM and 11:00 PM, whenever Lim's father was not around, and he usually ordered a coffee and would sit for about half an hour. Of all the people at the shop, the man only talked to Lim. Several other people also witnessed the man buying Lim sweets. The man was described to be of Chinese descent, dark and stout, of average height, and did not wear glasses. Four days after Lim's body was found, the police released a sketch of the man, who was presumed to be aged between 30 and 40 years, about 1.65m tall, and of medium build. The man was also said to usually wear a polo T-shirt and shorts, and frequent the vicinity of Blocks 59, 61, 64, and 75 Toa Payoh Lorong 5.

There was a scrawl on Ang's bedroom wall written by Lim - a date, 24 June - which was the date Lim went missing and the supposed date of Lim's appointed meeting with her father's friend. The year "1994" was also written beside the date. A piece of paper torn from a cigarette carton was found in Lim's brown pouch, which Lim left behind at her mother's stall. The piece of paper had a pager number scribbled on it. Below the number was the Chinese character Di (弟), which means little brother. It was thought likely that the pager number was linked to Lim's possible abductor and murderer.

The suspect was never located. Lim's murder became a cold case, but the police continued to regularly review the case over the next two decades; unlike civil cases, criminal cases (including murder) in Singapore do not have a statute of limitations. Lim's father approached the police in 1997 and 1998, only to be told that there were no new developments. In the same year Lim was killed, Crimewatch re-enacted the case and made a public appeal for information to solve it.

== Later years and 2021 public appeal ==
Throughout the next two decades, while the police continued to regularly investigate Lim Shiow Rong's murder, Lim's family moved on with their lives, still harbouring the hope that the killer would be caught and brought to justice. Lim's parents did not have another child after Lim was murdered, and Lim's younger sister, Lim Jia Hui, reached adulthood and worked in customer service after finishing her studies. Lim's parents and sister were still struggling with sadness over the death of Lim; Lim's mother hoped that the killer would turn himself in if he truly felt regret for his actions.

The murder also made an impact on Lim's father, Lim Kim Siong, who decided to stop taking drugs, and became a good father to his only surviving child. Lim's father was said to feel guilty and blamed himself for Lim's death, feeling that he did not protect his family well. Lim Kim Siong died in 2016 at age 67 due to an abdominal aortic aneurysm, and until his death, he remained attached to his elder daughter's case.

On 10 January 2021, in light of the recent capture of Ahmad Danial Mohamed Rafa'ee for the alleged murder of missing student Felicia Teo Wei Ling (who was reported missing at age 19 in 2007 before she was found to be murdered), Lim's mother and sister became hopeful and made a public appeal for new information to help solve the case and locate the killer. They also hoped that the police could revisit Lim's murder and renew their investigations. The police later confirmed that the investigations into Lim's murder were still ongoing, and an informant later arrived with new information relating to the case.

== See also ==
- Death of Felicia Teo
- Death of Winnifred Teo
- Murder of Goh Beng Choo
- Capital punishment in Singapore
- List of major crimes in Singapore
