= Teoh =

Teoh (also commonly rendered as Teo) is a romanised Chinese family name. It is a romanization of Teochew and Hokkien names, particularly simplified Chinese: 张; traditional Chinese: (張; pinyin: Zhāng; Pe̍h-ōe-jī: tiuⁿ / tioⁿ; HKG Cantonese: Cheung). It is also rendered as Tiu, Tio, Thio, and Tiew.

== Distribution ==
The romanization "Teo" is the 11th-most-common surname among Chinese Singaporeans, with 46,800 bearers making up 1.9% of that population.

In the United States, the romanization "Tiu" was the most common during the 1990 census, ranked 32,695th overall, and the romanization "Teo" was the most common during the year 2000 census, ranked 26,141st overall.

== List of persons with the surname ==
Teo

- Teo Chee Hean, Singaporean politician
- Magdalene Teo, Bruneian ambassador
- Nicholas Teo, Malaysian singer
- Josephine Teo, Singaporean politician
- Charles Teo, Australian neurosurgeon
- Teo Nie Ching, Malaysian politician
- Pete Teo, Malaysian singer songwriter, film composer and filmmaker
- Pearry Reginald Teo, Singaporean film director/producer
- Teo Ho Pin, Singaporean politician
- Clement Teo, Team Manager of the S. League team, Tampines Rover
- Eddie Teo, Chairman of Singapore's Public Service Commission
- Kelvin Teo, Malaysian entrepreneur
- Nick Teo, Singaporean Actor
- Gibson Teo, Singaporean Music Producer
- Felicia Teo Wei Ling, Singaporean student who was presumed missing in 2007 before she was revealed to be murdered
- Teo Ghim Heng, Singaporean murderer who killed his pregnant wife and daughter

Teoh

- Teoh Tiang Chye, Justice of Peace in Malacca
- Teoh Chye Hin, Malaysian secretary general of the Asian Football Confederation (AFC)
- Lina Teoh, or Angelina Teoh Pick Lim, Miss Malaysia, 1998.
- Teoh Beng Hock, Malaysian journalist and political aide
- Rocky Teoh, Malaysian singer and composer.
- Patrick Teoh, nickname "Voice of Malaysia", actor and radio personality in Malaysia
- Lina Teoh, Miss Malaysia World 1998/1999 pageant
- Jason Teoh, Malaysian politician, chairman for MCA Gelang Patah division
- David Teoh, Australian businessman and founder of TPG Telecom.
- Teoh Ze Tong, Star Search series winner

Thio

- Thio Li-ann, Singaporean law professor
- Thio Su Mien, Singaporean legal academic and lawyer

Tio

- Elkan William Tio Baggott, Indonesian football player

Tiu

- Chris Tiu, Filipino basketball player
- Kriesha Tiu, Filipino-American singer
