= Trang (surname) =

Family name

Trang is a Vietnamese surname.

It was formerly written as both 張 and 莊 in chữ Nho, a script now almost entirely obsolete. The former is derived from the Chinese surname Zhang, the latter from Zhuang.

There were 1,803 bearers during the year 2000 US Census, ranking Trang 14,432nd overall and 544th among Asian and Pacific Islanders.

It is also a Scandinavian surname, primitively in Norway and Denmark; although there's a fairly small number of people bearing the last name in the mentioned countries. In these Nordic countries, its meaning is "narrow".

== Notable people ==
- Corinne Trang, French-born cookbook author
- Thuy Trang (1973–2001), Vietnamese-born American actress
