= Death of Felicia Teo =

2007 homicide case of student originally reported as a missing person case

Felicia Teo Wei Ling (Gaia)
- Teo pictured before her death
- Born: 23 February 1988; Singapore
- Died: 30 June 2007 (aged 19); Marine Terrace, Singapore
- Cause of death: Alleged complications after ecstasy consumption
- Other name: Gaia
- Education: Diploma in fine arts at LASALLE College of the Arts (incomplete due to her alleged death)
- Occupations: Student; Part-time bartender
- Known for: Her disappearance and alleged murder
- Height: 1.69 m (5 ft 7 in)

Felicia Teo Wei Ling (23 February 1988 – 30 June 2007; 张玮凌 Zhāng Weǐlíng), was a Singaporean who was presumed dead after she went missing on 30 June 2007. It was alleged that she was murdered by her two friends, whom she visited on the same night. Teo was reported missing four days after she disappeared, and there were both search efforts and investigations made to trace her whereabouts. The case made headlines due to extensive public appeals and searches for Teo, and became one of Singapore's high-profile missing person cases.

13 years later, in 2020, the police investigations made a breakthrough and the case of Teo's disappearance was re-classified as murder. One of Teo's two friends, Ahmad Danial bin Mohamed Rafa'ee, who claimed to last see her leaving his flat before she went missing, was arrested and charged with murder after the police found in his possession one of Teo's belongings that she was carrying when she disappeared. The second suspect, Ragil Putra Setia Sukmarahjana, was on the police's wanted list and remains at large outside Singapore.

Ahmad's murder charge was temporarily withdrawn, but he received a 26-month jail term for fresh charges of misappropriating Teo's belongings, giving false evidence, and the illegal disposal of Teo's corpse, which remained missing.

== Background and disappearance ==
Teo was a final-year fine arts student of LASALLE College of the Arts. She was known to be sociable, mingle with her friends, would constantly send messages, and was often on her phone. She used to study at Monk's Hill Secondary School (now defunct) before she went on to enroll at LASALLE to study in a diploma course. She was also working part-time as a bartender at a bar in Clarke Quay, and her colleagues remembered her as a responsible worker. She was the elder of two children and had a younger brother (aged 18 in 2007).

On 29 June 2007, Teo left her home in Bras Basah, and went out for a party at LASALLE with her friends. This was the last time her parents saw her. Teo told her parents earlier that she would be attending her friend's wedding the following day. However, the next day (30 June), Teo did not show up at the friend's wedding. Teo could not be contacted for the next three days. On 3 July, Teo's mother reported her daughter as missing to the police.

== Report and search efforts ==
Police began investigating and initially classified Teo's case as a missing persons case. Police investigations revealed that Teo last went to the 10th-floor flat of two male schoolmates at Marine Terrace on 30 June 2007. The two friends told police that Teo went to their shared flat and stayed until about 2:00 AM on the morning of 30 June before leaving on her own. They claimed that that was the last time they saw Teo. It was determined that Teo went missing on that day.

The police did not find any incriminating facts linking the two men to her disappearance and considered them as witnesses. CCTV footage showed Teo entering the lift with the men, but there was no footage of Teo leaving the flat and she was believed to have used the stairs. A police gazette was issued to locate her. A property gazette was also issued for properties believed to be in Teo's possession when she was reported missing; at the time she disappeared, Teo was carrying a cream-coloured bag which contained her Apple laptop and digital camera. The police also appealed to the public to contact the police should anyone have any information of Teo's whereabouts.

A missing poster of Felicia Teo, which was distributed by Teo's family and friends.

Teo's friends and family also conducted their own search. Since her disappearance, 100 friends and relatives have searched at Teo's favourite hangouts, including Marine Parade, Clarke Quay and East Coast. All of them disagreed with public speculations that Teo might have run away, as Teo only had S$30 on her. Furthermore, she would usually update her family and friends on her whereabouts and plans. Additionally, Teo had plans for an internship at a leading advertising firm, and had also bought tickets for a concert in August that year. Many people observed that Teo was her usual self in the days leading up to her disappearance.

Teo's mother, who speculated that her daughter may have been abducted and taken to Malaysia, went to Johor Bahru to distribute posters to the local residents, seeking their help to search for her daughter. A blog was created by one of Teo's friends dedicated to their search efforts. Teo's family went to Singtel to obtain Teo's past text messages and phone records. The last communication was a text message sent from Teo's mobile phone at 2:37 AM on 30 June 2007, the day she disappeared. It was received by a male friend whose identity is not known.

While search efforts did not produce any helpful information to trace Teo's whereabouts, Teo's mother, who still hoped for her daughter's survival, told a newspaper in 2011 that she kept telling herself that her daughter was still alive, married and living in another country. She also said that Teo was not unhappy up to the time she went missing.

Throughout the following years, the police regularly reviewed Teo's case among all the unsolved missing person cases to check for new leads. During regular reviews of this case, the police conducted interviews with Teo's family and other witnesses and also checked on activities involving Teo's possible movements, including her bank accounts, emails, social media accounts and travel records. No new leads were revealed. This regular review went on for 13 years before the Criminal Investigation Department (CID) took over the case.

== 2020 murder investigation ==
=== Breakthrough and arrest ===
In July 2020, 13 years after Teo disappeared, the case was passed on to the Criminal Investigation Department (CID) for further investigations. The CID later discovered new leads after tracing the belongings which were in Felicia Teo's possession prior to her disappearance. One of these items was found to be in the possession of Ahmad Danial bin Mohamed Rafa'ee, a Malay Singaporean, one of the two male friends who she visited on the day of her disappearance.

The case was re-classified as murder, and on 15 December 2020, the police arrested 35-year-old Ahmad. He was charged with murder two days later. It was alleged that between 1:39 AM and 7:20 AM on 30 June 2007, Ahmad and his Indonesian friend, Ragil Putra Setia Sukmarahjana, had killed Teo inside their flat and disposed of her body by unknown means.

Ragil (aged 32 in 2020) was assumed to be outside of Singapore and was listed as a fugitive on the wanted list. The police began to search for Teo's remains.

=== Background of suspects ===
One of the suspects, Ragil, was an Indonesian who came to Singapore to study, met Teo at LASALLE and they became friends. Ragil later introduced her to his friend Ahmad. Ahmad, who goes by the alias Danial Enemiko on his social media accounts, studied for a diploma in communication design and advertising at LASALLE from 2000 to 2004. He also worked as a creative manager at gaming firm Razer until 2020.

Ragil graduated from LASALLE in 2011 with an honours degree in video art. He studied at the college from 2006 to 2011. He also worked many filmmaking jobs based in Jakarta, Indonesia, and was last known to be employed as a director's assistant at the time of Ahmad's capture.

=== Reactions and case effect ===
Upon the news of Ahmad's arrest, Teo's family declined to speak to the media, citing their need for privacy. The family had continued to live in their home at Bras Basah to allow Teo to be able to find them if she returned home. Some of Teo's neighbours were shocked to receive news of Teo's alleged murder.

On receiving news of Teo's alleged murder, several of Teo's friends shared memories of Teo and spoke of theirs and others' past hopes that Teo might be alive.

Teo's disappearance-turned-murder again brought media attention to several high-profile missing person cases that occurred in Singapore during the past three decades, including the 1986 McDonald's boys case, the 2002 disappearance of 14-year-old Tina Lim Xin Ying, and the 1994 case of Thomas Yeo See Ming's disappearance on Pulau Sibu Besar (an island on Singaporean waters). Teo's alleged murder also gave hope to the family of Lim Shiow Rong, a seven-year-old girl who was raped and murdered by an unknown person in 1995; in view of the renewed attention to Teo's case, Lim's mother and sister made a public appeal for new information to help solve the case and locate the killer, who has not been caught. The police later confirmed that the investigations in Lim's murder were ongoing and still not closed, and an informant later came up with new information relating to the case.

== Trial of Ahmad ==
=== Remand ===
Upon his arrest, Ahmad was remanded in police custody for investigations.

Ahmad appeared in court via video link, and was reportedly emotionless as the charge sheet was read out to him. After he was charged, Ahmad was held at the Tanglin and Central police divisions and was scheduled to return to court on 24 December. If found guilty of murder under the laws of Singapore, Ahmad would face the death penalty. Defence lawyer Shashi Nathan and two other colleagues from his law firm, Withers KhattarWong, would represent Ahmad in his murder trial. The case was adjourned to 31 December 2020, and on that day, Ahmad was further remanded for one more week due to an unspecified health condition.

Ahmad was ordered to undergo a three-week psychiatric assessment while in remand on 7 January 2021. On 28 January 2021, Ahmad's final psychiatric report was completed and would be used as evidence to assess his mental state at the time of the offence. Access to the report was restricted due to ongoing investigations. Ahmad remained remanded in prison to await trial, as murder suspects are denied bail.

Ahmad's case was adjourned to March 2021. On 24 May 2022, it was reported that Ahmad's remand order was extended and still in effect, while police continued to search for Ragil, who remained at large outside Singapore. Ahmad would make his next court appearance in July 2022.

=== Pre-trial hearing and withdrawal of murder charge ===
On 27 June 2022, Ahmad was granted a discharge not amounting to an acquittal for Teo's alleged murder, but it can be revived if the prosecution finds additional evidence against him. Shashi Nathan, Ahmad's lawyer, earlier tried to convince the district court judge, Eugene Teo, to grant Ahmad a full acquittal as giving Ahmad a discharge without acquitting him would potentially lead to Ahmad being psychologically haunted by the prospect of the murder charge hanging over his head indefinitely. Nathan also emphasised the sufferings Ahmad's wife (who left his flat due to harassment by members of the public) and his family members endured due to their connection to Ahmad and the public's condemnation of his actions.

Although District Judge Teo did not accept Nathan's proposal due to it being the wrong time to do so, he stated he did feel some sympathy for Ahmad upon hearing Nathan's concerns. He added that there may be a review in the future as to the extent of Ahmad's responsibility in the case, so it was not the right time to fully acquit Ahmad. Despite his discharge, Ahmad still faced a charge of disposal of Teo's corpse, as well as five other charges of misappropriating some of Teo's possessions, giving false information to the police, withholding crucial information of Teo's case, and falsifying phone calls or text messages to mislead people into thinking Teo was still alive. Ahmad, who was offered a S$20,000 bail, was scheduled to return to court on 6 July 2022 for trial, after he expressed his intention to plead guilty to the lower charges.

By then, the prosecution - consisting of Deputy Public Prosecutors (DPP) Yang Ziliang and R. Arvindren from the Attorney-General's Chambers (AGC) - had pursued the same six charges in addition to the murder charge on Ragil's charge sheet, and the Singapore Police Force had contacted the Indonesian authorities, who agreed to help their Singaporean counterparts to trace the whereabouts of Ragil. The prosecution stated there was no prejudice on Ahmad in his case and commented on the unusual nature of Ragil's fugitive status, "This is not a case where police have been trying for many years to trace the co-accused. The tracing of him only began after the accused was arrested 1.5 years ago and new facts came to light during the investigations."

Although the court documents did not reveal who exactly killed Teo or her cause of death, it was revealed that Ahmad and Ragil disposed of Teo's corpse at the vicinity of Punggol Track 24 after the alleged killing. The search efforts resulted in the discovery of a skull fragment where Ahmad and Ragil abandoned the corpse. The skull fragment was sent by the prosecution to the United States for mitochondrial DNA testing to determine if the skull fragment belongs to Teo.

=== Guilty plea and 26-month jail term ===
On 6 July 2022, Ahmad returned to court and was set to plead guilty to his charges. However, the guilty plea was adjourned and a pre-trial hearing would be conducted on 5 August 2022, as the prosecution and defence needed to have discussions and resolve several issues. Nathan also filed an appeal for Ahmad's murder charge to be fully withdrawn with a discharge amounting to an acquittal; if an acquittal was granted, it meant that Ahmad would not be charged again for the same offence. The appeal was scheduled for hearing at the High Court in March 2023. The Chief Justice, Sundaresh Menon, was appointed to hear the appeal.

While the appeal was being processed, the full grounds of decision by District Judge Eugene Teo were released on 12 August 2022. He explained that there was no basis to acquit Ahmad as at the district court hearing stage, there were no precedent cases of murder suspects acquitted before their official trial at the High Court (only the High Court can hear cases of murder or other crimes that attract the death sentence). Giving Ahmad an acquittal would potentially give him legal immunity against the murder charge should there be evidence that demonstrated Ahmad could be the one killing Teo, so it would not be appropriate for Ahmad to be acquitted until such a stage where the trial judge deemed Ahmad should gain an acquittal over Teo's murder. Given that Ahmad had hidden his criminal behaviour with lies and pretenses for 13 years prior to his capture, the court felt it would not be safe to grant an acquittal at this stage, even if Ahmad was genuinely not the killer.

Ahmad returned to court to submit his guilty plea on 14 October 2022, and on the same day, Ahmad was sentenced to 26 months' imprisonment for abandoning Teo's body, stealing her belongings and giving false evidence to the authorities. Ahmad's sentence was one month short of the 27-month jail term sought by the prosecution in their closing submissions. The DNA results from the American forensic authorities revealed that the skull most likely belonged to Teo. Ahmad's 26-month sentence was backdated to the date of his arrest (15 December 2020) and since most of his sentence was inclusive of his period of remand before his bail, Ahmad would be out of prison within a short amount of time, on remission for good behavior. It was revealed before Ahmad's sentencing that during the early morning hours of 30 June 2007 (the date of Teo's death), from Ahmad's account, he and the missing suspect Ragil, as well as Teo, were consuming ecstasy, an illegal drug, and they all slept for six hours before both men woke up to find Teo dead under "unknown circumstances", which led to them purchasing tools to dispose of Teo's corpse.

During sentencing, the district court judge admonished Ahmad for callously taking advantage of Teo's death by taking her belongings and hiding the truth from her friends and family, leaving them unable to find closure. The prosecution argued that Ahmad's actions were highly premeditated with a great amount of planning, and his cover-up of Teo's death caused the unnecessary channelling of resources in the 13-year long fruitless search for 19-year-old Teo, who was actually dead despite being reported missing. Ahmad's lawyer Shashi Nathan, who earlier sought a 18-month term of imprisonment, argued that Ahmad was genuinely regretful of his actions but failed to muster sufficient courage to tell the truth for fear of losing his family, life, reputation and career, and also expressed his intention to apologise to Teo's friends and family for the emotional torture he put them through.

=== Appeal for full acquittal ===
On 9 March 2023, Ahmad lost his appeal for a full acquittal of the murder charge, as the Chief Justice Sundaresh Menon noted that Ragil was still at large and the charge of murder against Ahmad cannot proceed until and unless Ragil's assistance was secured. The seriousness of the charge faced by Ahmad was also supported by the public interest, which revolved around the need to resolve investigations, which was more of a priority than Ahmad's own personal interest in being freed from the hardships (including the rejection of his new passport application) that come from having an unresolved murder charge hanging over him. The judge also agreed that by granting a full acquittal, Ahmad would potentially be immune from a potential prosecution for murder should there be new evidence to shed more light on his involvement in the offence committed.

== See also ==
- Capital punishment in Singapore
- Death of Ayakannu Marithamuthu
- List of major crimes in Singapore
- List of solved missing person cases (2000s)
