= Death of Ayakannu Marithamuthu =

1984 crime in Singapore

Ayakannu Marithamuthu
- Born: Ayakannu Marithamuthu; 1950; Singapore
- Disappeared: 12 December 1984 (aged 33–34); Cherry Road, Singapore
- Status: Missing for 41 years, 6 months and 27 days
- Cause of death: Unknown, but speculated to be murdered
- Resting place: Unknown
- Other name: Ayakanno Marithamuthu
- Occupation: Caretaker
- Employer: Public Utilities Board Chalets
- Known for: Possible murder victim

Ayakannu Marithamuthu, (Note: Other sources spell his name as Ayakanno Marithamuthu.) a 34-year-old caretaker, disappeared on 12 December 1984. He had lived near Orchard Road Presbyterian Church in Singapore. On 23 March 1987, investigators brought in six individuals for questioning. Charges were brought, but the defendants were released on the day of the trial due to lack of evidence.

During the two-year-long investigation, neither Marithamuthu's body nor the murder weapons were recovered. The incident has been referred to as the Curry Murder, because of allegations that the victim's body was cooked into a curry before being disposed of in garbage containers.

== Background ==
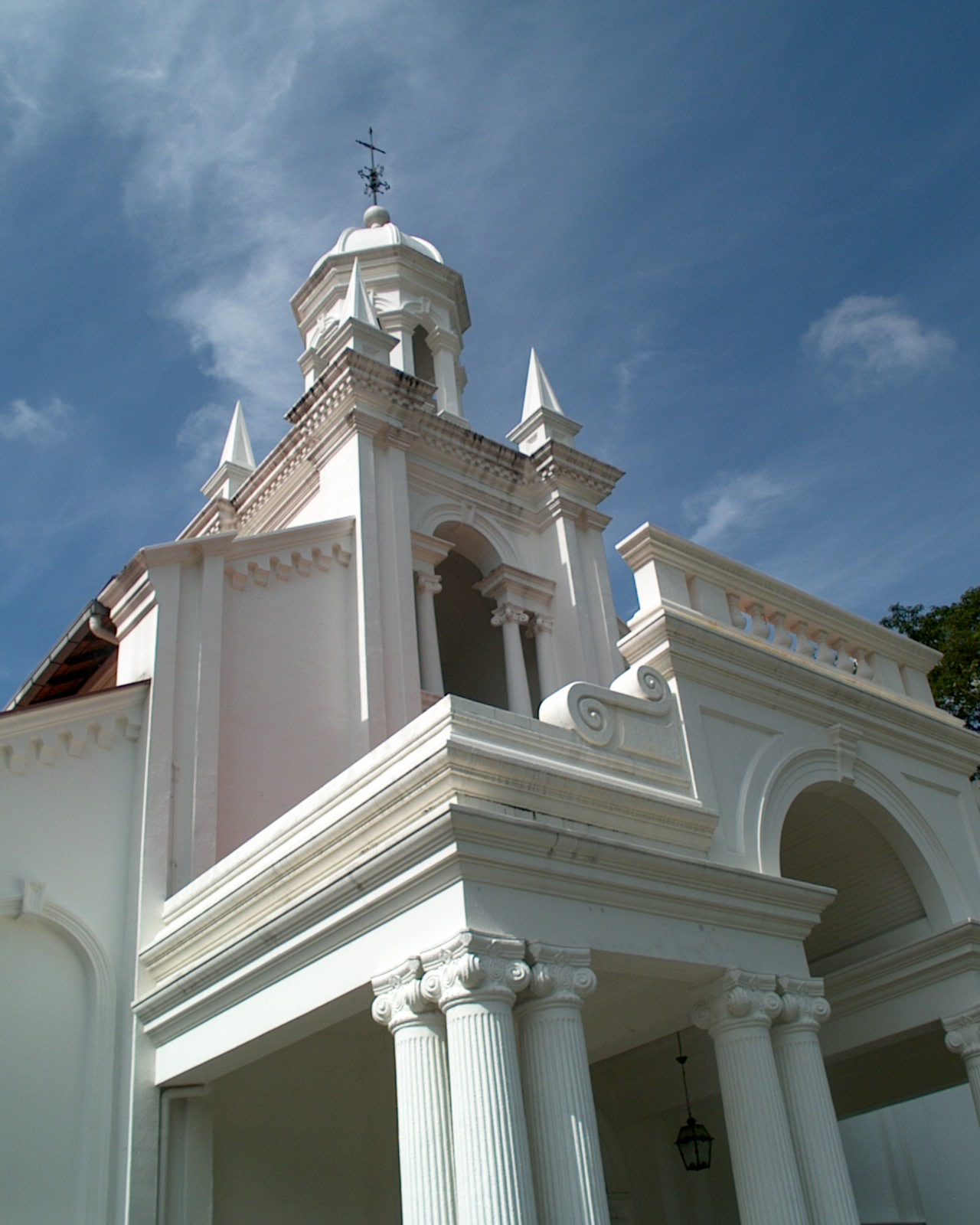
The police alleged that Marithamuthu was killed in the caretakers quarters of the Orchard Road Presbyterian Church, Singapore.

Of Indian descent, Ayakannu Marithamuthu (born 1950) worked as a caretaker in charge of the Public Utilities Board-run holiday chalets situated alongside Biggin Hill Road, Changi, Singapore. Since around 1980, Marithamuthu, his wife and their three children had been residing at a small house behind Orchard Road Presbyterian Church.

Ayakannu Marithamuthu was allegedly killed just outside his house on 12 December 1984. His wife, Nagaratha Vally Ramiah, filed a missing person's report at the Joo Chiat Police Station, where she stated that he had gone to the Genting Highlands to try his hand at gambling.

The police began an investigation during which they arrested Nagaratha, her three brothers (Rathakrishnana Ramayah, Shanmugam Chandra, and Balakrishna Ramiah), her mother Kamachi Krishnasamy, and her sister-in-law Mary Manuee (Rathakrishnana's wife). The police alleged that the first four suspects had planned to kill him, while the remaining two suspects were alleged to have given them support.

== Detention and release ==
The six suspects were to be tried for murder, with a possible death penalty if convicted. They were represented by lawyers Subbiah Pillai and Raj Kumar. Approximately two hundred people were seated in the courtroom to witness the trial. On the day of the trial, the prosecutors admitted that the evidence was insufficient and the judge in charge of the case released the suspects after granting them a discharge not amounting to an acquittal.

Police stated that they were undertaking further investigations, and that the suspects would be brought back to court if more substantial evidence was uncovered. The same day they were released, the three brothers were re-arrested under the Criminal Law Act and detained in Changi Prison for four years before being released.

== Coverage in the press and impact ==
Central Investigations Department director Jagjit Singh stated, "This is one of the most unusual and bizarre cases we have ever handled." In 1995, the Television Corporation of Singapore (TCS) broadcast a television serial titled Doctor Justice, starring Collin Chee and Aileen Tan. One of the thirty episodes depicted an exaggerated version of the "Curry Murder". In 2004, Singaporean documentary series Missing re-enacted the Curry Murder case, with the names of the suspects and victim being changed to protect their true identities for privacy reasons.

== See also ==
- List of people who disappeared
